= 2012 FIM Motocross World Championship =

2012 Motocross World Championship

Seasons
- ← 2011 2013 →

The 2012 FIM Motocross World Championship was the 56th F.I.M. Motocross World Championship season. It included 30 races at 15 events including The Netherlands, Bulgaria, Italy, Mexico, Brazil, France, Portugal, Belgium, Sweden, Latvia, Russia, Czech Republic, Great Britain and Germany.

== 2012 Calendar ==
The 2012 calendars of the FIM Motocross World Championships promoted by Youthstream were finalised on 7 July 2011.

Round	Date	Grand Prix	Location	Race 1 Winner	Race 2 Winner	Round Winner
MX1
1	April 9	Netherlands	Valkenswaard	(Italy) Antonio Cairoli	(Italy) Antonio Cairoli	(Italy) Antonio Cairoli
2	April 22	Bulgaria	Sevlievo	(France) Christophe Pourcel	(France) Gautier Paulin	(France) Gautier Paulin
3	April 29	Italy	Fermo	(France) Christophe Pourcel	(Italy) Antonio Cairoli	(France) Christophe Pourcel
4	May 13	Mexico	Guadalajara	(Italy) Antonio Cairoli	(Italy) David Philippaerts	(Italy) Antonio Cairoli
5	May 20	Brazil	Beto Carrero	(France) Christophe Pourcel	(France) Xavier Boog	(France) Christophe Pourcel
6	June 3	France	Saint-Jean-d'Angély	(Italy) Antonio Cairoli	(Italy) Antonio Cairoli	(Italy) Antonio Cairoli
7	June 10	Portugal	Águeda	(Belgium) Clément Desalle	(France) Gautier Paulin	(Belgium) Clément Desalle
8	June 17	Belgium	Bastogne	(Italy) Antonio Cairoli	(Italy) Antonio Cairoli	(Italy) Antonio Cairoli
9	July 1	Sweden	Uddevalla	(Belgium) Clément Desalle	(Belgium) Clément Desalle	(Belgium) Clément Desalle
10	July 15	Latvia	Ķegums	(Italy) Antonio Cairoli	(Belgium) Kevin Strijbos	(Italy) Antonio Cairoli
11	July 22	Russia	Semigorje	(Italy) Antonio Cairoli	(Italy) Antonio Cairoli	(Italy) Antonio Cairoli
12	August 5	Czech Republic	Loket	(Italy) Antonio Cairoli	(Italy) Antonio Cairoli	(Italy) Antonio Cairoli
13	August 19	United Kingdom	Winchester	(Italy) Antonio Cairoli	(Italy) Antonio Cairoli	(Italy) Antonio Cairoli
14	September 2	Benelux	Lierop	(Italy) Antonio Cairoli	(Italy) Antonio Cairoli	(Italy) Antonio Cairoli
15	September 9	Europe	Faenza	(Italy) Antonio Cairoli	(Italy) Antonio Cairoli	(Italy) Antonio Cairoli
16	September 23	Germany	Teutschenthal	(Italy) Antonio Cairoli	(Italy) Antonio Cairoli	(Italy) Antonio Cairoli
MX2
1	April 9	Netherlands	Valkenswaard	(Netherlands) Jeffrey Herlings	(Netherlands) Jeffrey Herlings	(Netherlands) Jeffrey Herlings
2	April 22	Bulgaria	Sevlievo	(Belgium) Joel Roelants	(United Kingdom) Tommy Searle	(United Kingdom) Tommy Searle
3	April 29	Italy	Fermo	(Netherlands) Jeffrey Herlings	(Netherlands) Jeffrey Herlings	(Netherlands) Jeffrey Herlings
4	May 13	Mexico	Guadalajara	(Netherlands) Jeffrey Herlings	(Netherlands) Jeffrey Herlings	(Netherlands) Jeffrey Herlings
5	May 20	Brazil	Beto Carrero	(United Kingdom) Tommy Searle	(United Kingdom) Tommy Searle	(United Kingdom) Tommy Searle
6	June 3	France	Saint-Jean-d'Angély	(Netherlands) Jeffrey Herlings	(United Kingdom) Tommy Searle	(Netherlands) Jeffrey Herlings
7	June 10	Portugal	Águeda	(Netherlands) Jeffrey Herlings	(United Kingdom) Tommy Searle	(Netherlands) Jeffrey Herlings
8	June 17	Belgium	Bastogne	(Netherlands) Jeffrey Herlings	(United Kingdom) Tommy Searle	(United Kingdom) Tommy Searle
9	July 1	Sweden	Uddevalla	(Netherlands) Jeffrey Herlings	(United Kingdom) Tommy Searle	(United Kingdom) Tommy Searle
10	July 15	Latvia	Ķegums	(Belgium) Joel Roelants	(Belgium) Jeremy van Horebeek	(Belgium) Joel Roelants
11	July 22	Russia	Semigorje	(Netherlands) Jeffrey Herlings	(Netherlands) Jeffrey Herlings	(Netherlands) Jeffrey Herlings
12	August 5	Czech Republic	Loket	(Netherlands) Jeffrey Herlings	(Netherlands) Jeffrey Herlings	(Netherlands) Jeffrey Herlings
13	August 19	United Kingdom	Winchester	(United Kingdom) Tommy Searle	(United Kingdom) Tommy Searle	(United Kingdom) Tommy Searle
14	September 2	Benelux	Lierop	(Netherlands) Jeffrey Herlings	(Netherlands) Jeffrey Herlings	(Netherlands) Jeffrey Herlings
15	September 9	Europe	Faenza	(Netherlands) Jeffrey Herlings	(Netherlands) Jeffrey Herlings	(Netherlands) Jeffrey Herlings
16	September 23	Germany	Teutschenthal	(United Kingdom) Tommy Searle	(United Kingdom) Tommy Searle	(United Kingdom) Tommy Searle
MX3
1	April 9	Netherlands	Valkenswaard	(Belgium) Yentel Martens	(Belgium) Kevin Wouts	(Belgium) Kevin Wouts
2	April 15	France	Castelnau-de-Lévis	(France) Cedric Soubeyras	(France) Gregory Aranda	(France) Cedric Soubeyras
3	May 13	Bulgaria	Troyan	(Slovenia) Klemen Gerčar	(Czech Republic) Martin Michek	(Czech Republic) Martin Michek
4	May 20	Italy	Arco di Trento	(Austria) Michael Staufer	(Austria) Matthias Walkner	(Austria) Matthias Walkner
5	June 3	Croatia	Mladina	(Slovenia) Klemen Gerčar	(Slovenia) Matevž Irt	(Austria) Matthias Walkner
6	June 10	Slovenia	Orehova vas	(Slovenia) Klemen Gerčar	(Slovenia) Klemen Gerčar	(Slovenia) Klemen Gerčar
7	July 1	Slovakia	Šenkvice	(Czech Republic) Martin Michek	(Czech Republic) Martin Michek	(Czech Republic) Martin Michek
8	August 19	United Kingdom	Winchester	(Austria) Matthias Walkner	(Czech Republic) Martin Michek	(Czech Republic) Martin Michek
	September 9	Portugal	Águeda	Cancelled		
9	September 23	Germany	Teutschenthal	(Czech Republic) Filip Neugebauer	(Czech Republic) Filip Neugebauer	(Czech Republic) Filip Neugebauer

== Riders' Championship ==
=== MX1 ===
Points are awarded to the top 20 classified finishers.

Position	1st	2nd	3rd	4th	5th	6th	7th	8th	9th	10th	11th	12th	13th	14th	15th	16th	17th	18th	19th	20th
Points	25	22	20	18	16	15	14	13	12	11	10	9	8	7	6	5	4	3	2	1

(key)

Pos	Rider	Bike	NED (Netherlands)		BUL (Bulgaria)		ITA (Italy)		MEX (Mexico)		BRA (Brazil)		FRA (France)		POR (Portugal)		BEL (Belgium)		SWE (Sweden)		LAT (Latvia)		RUS (Russia)		Loket (Czech Republic)		GBR (United Kingdom)		BEN (Benelux)		EUR (Europe)		GER (Germany)		Pts
1	(Italy) Cairoli	KTM	1	1	4	3	3	1	1	3	8	9	1	1	3	2	1	1	35	30	1	2	1	1	1	1	1	1	1	1	1	1	1	1	692
2	(Belgium) Desalle	Suzuki	2	2	3	18	4	3	2	2	13	2	5	4	1	3	3	3	1	1	7	4	3	2	4	2	6	11	6	7	3	4	2	4	594
3	(France) Paulin	Kawasaki	4	7	2	1	2	6	4	DNS	3	5	2	3	4	1	2	9	7	9	4	6	7	7	5	11	4	3	5	9	7	3	4	5	536
4	(France) C. Pourcel	Kawasaki	32	9	1	2	1	2	16	4	1	4	3	2	2	4	5	2	2	2	9	12	4	4	2	3	9	16	25	DNS	2	2	8	9	521
5	(Belgium) De Dycker	Honda	5	6	7	4	7	4	3	5	6	13	7	10	5	5	10	6	11	11	2	3	2	3	7	8	3	5	3	2	4	7	5	10	505
6	(Belgium) Strijbos	KTM	6	5	12	10	10	7	5	10	5	3	15	12	15	10	4	4	5	3	10	1	5	12	15	12	7	12	9	6	11	11	13	13	405
7	(France) Boog	Kawasaki	8	14	6	7	5	14	8	7	16	1	4	7	7	11	6	10	9	8	11	9	14	9	6	7	5	7	12	11	13	12	9	7	398
8	(Estonia) Leok	Suzuki	9	11	14	8	11	11	6	6	20	7	12	16	13	8	9	7	6	4	6	7	9	10	12	6	11	8	4	3	6	9	11	15	381
9	(Russia) Bobryshev	Honda	39	12	8	5	6	5			9	10	6	29	26	7	33	5	33	DNS	5	11	6	5	9	10	27	4	7	4	8	6	6	6	325
10	(Portugal) Gonçalves	Honda	10	4	9	27	20	9	9	8	4	8	9	9	14	6	15	14	22	7	3	5	8	6	11	5	14	6	14	8	27	DNS			315
11	(United Kingdom) Simpson	Yamaha	11	8	11	9	8	27	28	DNS	7	12	14	18	10	12	16	12	4	5	8	8	13	11	8	14	13	10	8	5	5	10	15	14	311
12	(France) S. Pourcel	Kawasaki	23	18	15	6	26	23	13	14	22	21	11	6	8	13	8	11	3	6	14	17	12	18	16	28	24	14			10	5	10	8	229
13	(Italy) Guarneri	KTM	13	17	30	11	12	16	24	11	14	15	18	13	11	16	29	8	30	10	12	24	11	13	13	13	12	9	13	12	12	8	16	12	226
14	(Spain) Barragan	Honda	17	13	16	12	14	24	7	9	12	11	17	15	6	14	13	33	12	13	13	13	10	8	27	16	8	13	27	10	25	14	17	20	224
15	(Italy) Philippaerts	Yamaha	7	15	5	13	9	8	10	1	2	6	10	5	12	9	7	13	27	DNS															212
16	(Germany) Nagl	KTM																							3	4	2	2	2	26			7	3	138
17	(Latvia) Karro	KTM	15	11	17	24	16	12	11	13	10	14	13	14	9	17	11	27																	112
18	(Netherlands) de Reuver	Kawasaki															20	16	10	12	16	10			18	DNS	15	18	11	24	16	16			74
19	(France) Potisek	Honda	19	23	18	16	19	26					31	24	18	19	17	32			18	15			17	24	16	26	15	14	14	15	14	21	72
20	(France) Soubeyras	Honda	36	DNS	13	14	15	15									14	31	8	14					14	15	30	DNS							67
21	(France) Frossard	Yamaha	3	3			30	DNS	26	DNS			8	8																					66
22	(France) Boissière	TM	20	29	31	30	18	13					16	11	17	15	12	15	28	15															58
23	(Australia) Ferris	Kawasaki			20	15	17	10	12	12	11	22	19	DNS																					52
24	(Germany) Roczen	KTM																															3	2	42
25	(France) Aranda	Yamaha	34	30	10	29																			10	9	29	24	22	19	20	18	DNS	23	40
26	(New Zealand) Coppins	Yamaha																													9	13	12	11	39
27	(Italy) Bonini	KTM	14	22	19	17	13	25							19	28	25	18	13	28	17	22													38
28	(Latvia) Justs	Honda	37	35	26	22	27	20					20	21			31	23	15	16	19	19	15	14	28	25	28	28	17	23	18	25			37
29	(Germany) Schiffer	Suzuki	12	16																									10	13					33
30	(Finland) Tiainen	Kawasaki	25	24	25	23	24	19	14	15	17	19	30	26	21	22	26	24	17	20	25	16			21	20	23	23							32
31	(Estonia) Krestinov	Honda	18	19																	15	14					17	22	18	15					31
32	(France) Aubin	Honda	24	31													18	17									10	15							24
33	(Netherlands) Brakke	Yamaha	16	21	22	20	21	17			24	17	23	19	16	18	21	21																	24
34	(United Kingdom) Mackenzie	KTM																											19	17	15	19	18	16	22
35	(United Kingdom) Law	KTM											24	23	20	23	32	20	23	21					22	18	22	20	26	18	17	17	20	18	21
36	(United Kingdom) Smith	Yamaha	27	27	23	21	22	18			15	18	25	27	28	DNS	22	22	19	22					25	27	21	17							18
37	(Sweden) Lindström	Kawasaki																	14	17	24	18							20	25					15
38	(Russia) Parshin	Honda																					16	15											11
39	(Moldova) Cociu	KTM	31	28	29	25	29	DNS					29	28	24	26	27	28	24	26	22	21	18	16	26	23	26	25	24	22	21	24			8
40	(Russia) Ivanutin	Yamaha																					17	17											8
41	(France) Leonce	Yamaha											21	17			19	19																	8
42	(Denmark) Hansen	Suzuki																	16	19															7
43	(Latvia) Livs	Kawasaki																			20	20							21	16					7
44	(United States) Fernandez	Yamaha							17	18																									7
45	(United Kingdom) Graeme	Yamaha																									18	21	23	20	19	20			7
46	(Mexico) M. García	KTM							15	23																									6
47	(Dominican Republic) Mejía	Kawasaki							20	16																									6
48	(Czech Republic) Michek	KTM																							19	17									6
49	(Poland) Lonka	Honda																											16	21					5
50	(Brazil) Balbi Jr.	Kawasaki									21	16																							5
51	(United Kingdom) Parker	KTM	38	37	21	19	23	28																	20	19	31	DNS							5
52	(Belgium) Delince	Yamaha																							29	30							21	17	4
53	(Mexico) Rodríguez	Yamaha							25	17																									4
54	(Brazil) Garcia	Honda									18	20																							4
55	(Mexico) Farfán	Honda							18	21																									3
56	(Sweden) Johnsson	Suzuki																	18	23															3
57	(Latvia) Macuks	Suzuki																	31	18															3
58	(Italy) Bertuzzo	Honda	35	38			28	22					26	20			23	29			23	25									24	22	22	19	3
59	(United Kingdom) Snow	Kawasaki																									20	19							3
60	(Mexico) D. García	Honda							21	19																									2
61	(United States) Howell	Kawasaki																															19	22	2
62	(Mexico) Vázquez	Yamaha							19	22																									2
63	(Spain) Garrido	Honda									19	23																							2
64	(United Kingdom) Whatley	Yamaha																									19	29							2
65	(Ukraine) Morozov	Yamaha																					19	DNS											2
66	(Republic of Ireland) Barr	Kawasaki	22	20																															1
67	(Mexico) Guzman	Kawasaki							23	20																									1
68	(Sweden) Sjöberg	Honda																	20	27															1
69	(Portugal) Alberto	Suzuki													29	20																			1
70	(Estonia) Laansoo	KTM																			21	23													0
71	(France) Batista	KTM																													23	21			0
72	(Denmark) Lynggaard	Kawasaki	28	25																					24	21									0
73	(Italy) Ciucci	KTM					25	21					28	25																					0
74	(Lithuania) Bučas	Honda																	21	25	26	26													0
75	(Portugal) Correia	Yamaha													27	21																			0
76	(Netherlands) Kras	Suzuki	21	34																															0
77	(Finland) Koskela	Kawasaki	26	26											22	24									23	22									0
78	(Italy) Albertoni	Kawasaki																													22	23			0
79	(France) Van Beveren	Yamaha											27	22			30	25																	0
80	(France) Lefrançois	Suzuki											22	29																					0
81	(Mexico) Mendoza	Honda							22	DNS																									0
82	(Portugal) Basaula	Kawasaki													23	25																			0
83	(Brazil) Ramos	Kawasaki									23	DNS																							0
84	(Ukraine) Pashchynskyi	KTM			26	24																													0
85	(Argentina) S. Navaro	Kawasaki									27	24																							0
86	(Sweden) Gustavsson	Honda																	29	24															0
87	(Sweden) Söderström	Honda															24	30	32	DNS															0
88	(United States) Thacker	Kawasaki													25	27	28	26			27	27			31	29									0
89	(Argentina) D. Navaro	KTM									26	25																							0
90	(United Kingdom) Chatfield	Kawasaki									25	DNS																							0
91	(Sweden) Thuresson	Honda																	25	DNS															0
92	(Hungary) Szvoboda	KTM																							30	26									0
93	(Latvia) Steinbergs	Kawasaki	30	32	27	28																													0
94	(Mexico) Rosales	Yamaha							27	DNS																									0
95	(Latvia) Teko	Honda	29	36	28	31																													0
96	(Venezuela) Humberto	Honda									28	DNS																							0
97	(Argentina) Correa	Kawasaki									29	DNS																							0
98	(Germany) Oldekamp	Kawasaki	33	33																															0
99	(Sweden) Hansson	KTM																	34	DNS															0
Pos	Rider	Bike	NED (Netherlands)		BUL (Bulgaria)		ITA (Italy)		MEX (Mexico)		BRA (Brazil)		FRA (France)		POR (Portugal)		BEL (Belgium)		SWE (Sweden)		LAT (Latvia)		RUS (Russia)		Loket (Czech Republic)		GBR (United Kingdom)		BEN (Benelux)		EUR (Europe)		GER (Germany)		Pts

=== MX2 ===
Pos	Rider	Bike	NED (Netherlands)		BUL (Bulgaria)		ITA (Italy)		MEX (Mexico)		BRA (Brazil)		FRA (France)		POR (Portugal)		BEL (Belgium)		SWE (Sweden)		LAT (Latvia)		RUS (Russia)		Loket (Czech Republic)		GBR (United Kingdom)		BEN (Benelux)		EUR (Europe)		GER (Germany)		Pts
1	(Netherlands) Herlings	KTM	1	1	2	2	1	1	1	1	12	3	1	2	1	2	1	2	1	7	2	18	1	1	1	1	2	2	1	1	1	1	33	2	694
2	(United Kingdom) Searle	Kawasaki	2	3	3	1	31	2	2	2	1	1	3	1	3	1	2	1	2	1	29	27	3	2	2	3	1	1	4	4	2	2	1	1	651
3	(Belgium) van Horebeek	KTM	4	4	4	3	2	4	3	3	3	5	2	3	2	6	3	3	31	2	3	1	2	3	31	2	5	3	2	2	3	3			559
4	(United Kingdom) Nicholls	KTM	5	9	7	12	4	35	10	6	7	10	10	8	6	5	5	8	6	4	4	DNS	4	5	3	5	4	5	5	9	7	13	4	5	443
5	(France) Tixier	KTM	6	7	9	14	7	5	5	8	9	12	6	5	4	11	6	6	8	8	5	3	6	6	11	DNS	9	12	8	7	5	4	3	8	434
6	(Belgium) Roelants	Kawasaki	3	2	1	4	30	DNS	6	4	5	4	4	4	9	17	4	5	3	16	1	2	5	4	10	9									367
7	(United Kingdom) Anstie	Honda	11	5	6	5	11	8	8	9	4	7	12	7	10	3	31	30	32	13	14	4	25	7	5	12	30	10	3	3	12	26	17	15	333
8	(Spain) Butrón	KTM	35	34	13	7	9	7	9	22	8	2	9	18	13	13	8	10	15	9	6	7	12	9	6	13	12	14	17	19	19	14	11	12	291
9	(Netherlands) Coldenhoff	KTM	15	6					15	7	6	15	22	15	8	15	15	11	9	12	8	5	7	13	13	11	15	9	9	6	14	15	13	7	273
10	(France) Ferrandis	Kawasaki	10	8	8	10	5	12	4	24	15	11			29	4	30	7	4	3	10	19	8	11	14	8	7	7	27	10					272
11	(Italy) Lupino	Husqvarna	13	13	14	6	14	6	11	11	11	13	21	6	35	10	10	9	40	10	12	10	10	19	7	17	14	33	11	11	18	16	10	19	262
12	(Switzerland) Tonus	Yamaha											7	17	7	18	7	4	14	38	9	9	9	10			6	6	6	5	6	7	6	3	246
13	(France) Febvre	KTM	21	15	16	33	22	36					11	13	14	8	11	16	13	11	7	11	13	17	8	6	10	30	14	17	9	5	7	10	221
14	(France) Teillet	Kawasaki	9	10	37	DNS			22	DNS			5	9	5	DNS							11	12	9	7	8	8	12	14	10	6	5	6	211
15	(United States) Osborne	Yamaha																	5	5	18	29	18	8	4	4	3	4	7	8	4	25	2	4	210
16	(Denmark) Larsen	Suzuki	12	24	15	22	10	15	12	13	23	17	20	11	17	14	12	13	38	31	16	6	22	14	22	14	34	11	13	12	27	11			163
17	(Russia) Tonkov	Honda	7	20	11	8	12	13							26	DNS			7	33	11	20	26	15	34	10	DNS	13	10	13	30	8	9	11	159
18	(Finland) Kullas	Suzuki	16	11	5	9	6	14	21	10	10	9	15	31	15	9	16	17	35	DNS															132
19	(France) Charlier	Yamaha					8	9	7	5	2	5	8	29					19	6	25	13													131
20	(Bulgaria) Petrov	Suzuki	14	36	12	13	13	10	16	12	14	14	13	10	12	12	18	14	11	18															131
21	(Switzerland) Guillod	KTM	18	17	20	21	15	18	14	14	13	16	23	DNS	16	16	13	18	12	15	20	15	17	18	16	16	16	17	21	21	13	29			121
22	(Belgium) Lieber	KTM	33	DSQ	35	16	21	31	13	23	17	18	14	12	36	DNS	19	15	21	14	17	28			30	27	11	16	16	15	11	10	8	21	115
23	(United Kingdom) Pocock	Yamaha	8	12	17	15	38	11							11	7	9	12																	87
24	(United States) Leib	Yamaha			10	11	3	3	26	DNS	24	13															31	34							69
25	(Belgium) Getteman	Suzuki	22	31	32	19	35	25					25	22	19	32	21	24	16	21	13	8	14	16	18	15	17	15							61
26	(United Kingdom) Banks-Browne	KTM	39	28	36	34									37	22									12	31	13	18	35	30	15	12	30	9	47
27	(France) Larrieu	Husqvarna	30	22	21	31	18	19					16	14	28	28	28	21													8	9	34	28	42
28	(Belgium) Fors	Yamaha	24	18	18	36	17	23					18	30	34	20	17	22	17	23	27	12	16	25	20	18									40
29	(Estonia) Rätsep	KTM	17	33									28	23	31	23	29	20	24	20	15	14	15	20	19	33	32	DNS							28
30	(Italy) Cervellin	TM	37	35	26	17	20	21					19	19	24	21	20	28	20	32	24	23			17	20	18	31	29	31	17	17	31	32	27
31	(Italy) Monticelli	Suzuki	38	23	19	29	16	37					19	19	24	21			28	27	26	26			21	21	29	19	30	18	16	31	15	20	24
32	(France) Paturel	Kawasaki																	10	17													21	14	22
33	(Latvia) Ivanovs	Kawasaki	20	27	27	24	34	32					27	20	27	25	22	26	18	34	19	16	20	26	24	26			28	33	28	27	18	18	19
34	(Norway) Heibye	KTM	36	DNS	28	28	37	24							21	DNS													15	16			14	35	18
35	(Slovenia) Gajser	KTM																													31	28	12	17	13
36	(France) Lacan	Kawasaki																															16	13	13
37	(Latvia) Justs	Honda	19	16	24	20	32	20					32	DNS									23	21	23	23	20	21	20	22	21	19	35	34	13
38	(Austria) Rauchenecker	KTM	34	14	22	23	24	16					24	25																					12
39	(Peru) Salazár	KTM							17	15																									10
40	(Belgium) Graulus	Suzuki																													26	18	19	16	10
41	(Switzerland) Seewer	Suzuki															14	19																	9
42	(Italy) Zeni	Yamaha	28	32	30	32	23	33					26	21	33	27	25	31	37	35					15	19	33	28			20	34			9
43	(France) Clermont	Honda											17	16																					9
44	(Belgium) Vandueren	Yamaha	25	26									34	24	18	19	23	23	34	30	21	25	19	24	33	22	19	32	34	25					9
45	(Mexico) Ruelas	Kawasaki							18	16																									8
46	(Brazil) Müller	Kawasaki									16	20																							6
47	(Mexico) Aguilar	KTM							19	17																									6
48	(Netherlands) Satink	Honda																	30	22	23	17							25	20					5
49	(Italy) Bernardini	KTM			23	25	36	17																											4
50	(Mexico) Mejía	Yamaha							24	18																									3
51	(Italy) Battig	Yamaha	32	29	34	18	25	34																											3
52	(Netherlands) Klein Kromhof	Honda																											32	18					3
53	(Brazil) Vilardi	Honda									18	DNS																							3
54	(Italy) Zecchina	Yamaha											30	26	20	24	24	29	23	19	22	22	21	22					33	DNS					3
55	(Italy) Mancuso	Honda					19	29																							23	20			3
56	(Brazil) Armstrong	Honda									20	19																							3
57	(Mexico) Nungaray	Suzuki							20	19																									3
58	(Netherlands) Kouwenberg	TM																			28	21			32	29	23	29	19	28	22	21	22	29	2
59	(Netherlands) de Waal	Suzuki	27	19																									22	23					2
60	(Brazil) Henn	Kawasaki									19	DNS																							2
61	(United Kingdom) Tombs	Honda																									21	20							1
62	(France) Kappel	KTM																															20	22	1
63	(Mexico) Sánchez	Yamaha							23	20																									1
64	(Argentina) Durbano	Kawasaki									21	21																							0
65	(Sweden) Bengtsson	KTM	23	21	25	30	27	27																											0
66	(Mexico) Vieyra	Suzuki							25	21																									0
67	(United Kingdom) Cottrell	Honda																									22	22							0
68	(Russia) Golovkin	Kawasaki			33	26	33	22					29	32	23	30	27	27	27	29	30	24	24	23	26	24	27	25	32	26	24	30	27	25	0
69	(Italy) Del Segato	KTM	30	29	31	27	26	26					31	28											28	32	28	27			29	22			0
70	(Argentina) Garro	Kawasaki									27	22																							0
71	(Belgium) Plessers	Honda													22	31																			0
72	(Norway) Nyegaard	Kawasaki																	22	36															0
73	(Brazil) Assunção	Honda									22	DNS																							0
74	(United Kingdom) Harwood	Honda																									24	24	23	27			24	23	0
75	(United Kingdom) Booker	Honda	31	25													26	25									26	23							0
76	(Italy) Moroni	Suzuki																							27	25					25	23			0
77	(Belgium) Van Doninck	KTM																															23	27	0
78	(Belgium) Dewulf	Yamaha																											26	24			25	24	0
79	(Sweden) J. Jönsson	Suzuki																	25	24															0
80	(New Zealand) Scheele	Honda																											24	29			29	26	0
81	(Belgium) Triest	Husqvarna											33	27											29	30	25	26	31	DNS					0
82	(Mexico) Alanis	KTM							28	25																									0
83	(Italy) Terraneo	Kawasaki																							25	28									0
84	(Portugal) Carvalho	Yamaha													25	29																			0
85	(Sweden) P. Jönssön	Suzuki																	36	25															0
86	(Uruguay) Rolando	Kawasaki									25	DNS																							0
87	(Sweden) Hjortmarker	Suzuki																	26	26															0
88	(Zimbabwe) Mitchell	KTM	26	DNS	29	34																													0
89	(Slovenia) Irt	Yamaha																															26	33	0
90	(Brazil) Amaral	Honda									26	DNS																							0
91	(Mexico) Oros	Kawasaki							27	DNS																									0
92	(Italy) Amadio	Honda					28	28																											0
93	(Sweden) Olsson	KTM																	29	28															0
94	(Estonia) Park	Yamaha																															28	30	0
95	(Brazil) Lizott	Honda									28	DNS																							0
96	(Belgium) Brevers	Yamaha					29	30																											0
97	(Austria) Neurauter	KTM																															32	31	0
98	(Portugal) Peixe	Suzuki													32	DNS																			0
99	(Sweden) Björklund	Suzuki																	39	37															0
Pos	Rider	Bike	NED (Netherlands)		BUL (Bulgaria)		ITA (Italy)		MEX (Mexico)		BRA (Brazil)		FRA (France)		POR (Portugal)		BEL (Belgium)		SWE (Sweden)		LAT (Latvia)		RUS (Russia)		Loket (Czech Republic)		GBR (United Kingdom)		BEN (Benelux)		EUR (Europe)		GER (Germany)		Pts

=== MX3 ===
Pos	Rider	Bike	NED (Netherlands)		FRA (France)		BUL (Bulgaria)		ITA (Italy)		CRO (Croatia)		SLO (Slovenia)		SVK (Slovakia)		GBR (United Kingdom)		GER (Germany)		Pts
1	(Austria) Walkner	KTM	6	2	7	11	5	4	2	1	2	2	3	3	8	2	1	12	3	2	337
2	(Czech Republic) Michek	KTM	37	38	6	5	4	1	6	5	3	3	9	9	1	1	2	1	2	4	306
3	(Austria) G. Schmidinger	Honda	7	11	8	6	7	2	3	2	7	5	5	2	6	7	3	4	4	5	299
4	(Slovenia) Gerčar	Honda	16	15	10	10	1	6	4	13	1	4	1	1	2	3	6	3	13	25	277
5	(Finland) Pyrhönen	Honda	4	8	9	8	6	5	12	7	4	6	4	4	5	4	5	20			230
6	(Slovenia) M. Irt	Suzuki			20	17	2	7	5	3	6	1	2	5	4	35	16	5	33	DNS	194
7	(Austria) Staufer	KTM	23	30	11	9	3	10	1	4	5	12	30	7	3	12	4	21			185
8	(Czech Republic) Bartoš	KTM	34	22	13	14	9	8	8	10	9	7	28	6	7	5	9	10	9	6	185
9	(Poland) Lonka	Honda	5	4	12	12	8	14			13	11	8	8	9	29	12	9	7	9	175
10	(Finland) Söderberg	Honda	14	36	27	23	10	11	13	9	8	14	10	10	14	18	13	6	11	7	147
11	(Czech Republic) Michalec	Honda	22	20	17	16	11	9	19	8	16	9			10	6			25	29	90
12	(Belgium) Verstrepen	Honda	26	33	33	21	18	15	10	6	14	30	11	21	32	DNS	14	13	12	11	86
13	(Ukraine) Pashchynskyi	KTM	38	17	26	19	13	12	25	18			7	15	39	11			17	26	60
14	(France) Batista	KTM													20	10	15	8	6	10	57
15	(Russia) Parshin	Honda							15	16	10	8	18	18	34	8					54
16	(Austria) Rüf	Honda							9	30	32	13	14	13	22	16	18	17	19	18	52
17	(Czech Republic) Neugebauer	Kawasaki																	1	1	50
18	(Netherlands) Klein Kromhof	Honda	3	34			12	3	36	DNS											49
19	(Austria) A. Schmidinger	Honda			24	26	17	16			11	15	13	17	16	15			23	23	48
20	(France) Soubeyras	Honda			1	2															47
21	(Belgium) Wouts	Kawasaki	2	1																	47
22	(Belgium) Cambré	Yamaha							14	32	15	32	34	29			11	22	10	8	47
23	(France) Aranda	Yamaha			3	1															45
24	(Sweden) Sjöberg	Honda	13	7	15	13													14	27	43
25	(Spain) Barragan	Honda			2	3															42
26	(Belgium) Martens	Kawasaki	1	5													23	DNS			41
27	(Denmark) Lnyggaard	Kawasaki															7	2			36
28	(France) Potisek	Honda			5	4															34
29	(Germany) Baudrexl	KTM																	8	3	33
30	(Portugal) Gonçalves	Honda			4	7															32
31	(Sweden) Lindström	Kawasaki	11	3																	30
32	(Finland) Kovalainen	Yamaha	17	35	16	32	14	13	34	35	34	DNS					17	23	20	20	30
33	(United Kingdom) Law	KTM	9	6																	27
34	(Switzerland) Valente	KTM			28	29			17	19			17	24			20	15	18	14	27
35	(Ukraine) Morozov	Yamaha													11	13			21	13	26
36	(Switzerland) Germond	Suzuki			34	DNS			23	12	12	17	19	19	33	23					26
37	(Finland) Koskela	Kawasaki															10	7			25
38	(Austria) Schögler	KTM											12	14	12	DNS					25
39	(Slovenia) Kragelj	Yamaha											6	12							24
40	(Belgium) Van Daele	Kawasaki	8	10																	24
41	(Finland) Rouhiainen	Yamaha					16	17	37	23					15	14			26	19	24
42	(United Kingdom) Brunelle	Kawasaki															8	11			23
43	(Netherlands) Hool	TM	10	9																	23
44	(France) Roncin	Honda	29	21	19	15											24	14	22	16	20
45	(Austria) Reitbauer	KTM											15	16	19	DNS			15	32	19
46	(Spain) Cros	Suzuki	28	27	14	33			18	14											17
47	(Czech Republic) Smitka	Kawasaki																	5	31	16
48	(Estonia) Laansoo	KTM	12	24	18	18															15
49	(Italy) D'Angelo	Kawasaki							7	34											14
50	(Austria) Ziegler	KTM									18	10									14
51	(Belarus) Tyletski	KTM																	16	12	14
52	(Sweden) Andersson	Yamaha	15	13																	14
53	(Spain) Brucart	Yamaha			23	22	15	21	24	20	22	19	22	23	21	17			31	21	13
54	(Czech Republic) Žerava	Honda													18	12					12
55	(Switzerland) Schäfer	Kawasaki							21	11											10
56	(Switzerland) Schaffter	Yamaha							11	21											10
57	(Slovenia) J. Irt	Suzuki											32	11							10
58	(Latvia) Macuks	Suzuki	32	12																	9
59	(Slovenia) Urbas	Kawasaki									17	20	21	33	17	25					9
60	(Czech Republic) Sukup	Kawasaki													13	32					8
61	(Finland) Eriksson	KTM	18	16																	8
62	(Belgium) Foguenne	Suzuki	21	14																	7
63	(Slovenia) Bekanovič	Yamaha									19	16	33	31							7
64	(United Kingdom) Hill	Suzuki															19	16			7
65	(Ecuador) Cordovez	Honda							28	15											6
66	(Belgium) Govaert	Yamaha																	32	15	6
67	(Italy) Fontanesi	Honda							27	29	27	25	16	20							6
68	(Spain) Arana	Yamaha			22	20	19	19	32	25	26	21	20	26	40	DNS					6
69	(Italy) Tagliaferri	Kawasaki							16	31											5
70	(Italy) Pedri	Honda							20	17											5
71	(Estonia) Mägi	Kawasaki	19	18	21	31															5
72	(Ukraine) Asmanov	KTM																	24	17	4
73	(Croatia) Leljak	KTM									20	18									4
74	(Bulgaria) Yochev	Honda					20	18													4
75	(United Kingdom) Purchase	Kawasaki															21	18			3
76	(Lithuania) Bučas	Honda	20	19	29	25															3
77	(Italy) Buso	KTM			32	30	24	25	33	DNS							22	19			2
78	(Austria) Kraus	KTM											23	35	25	19			35	DNS	2
79	(Bulgaria) Gochev	KTM					21	20													1
80	(North Macedonia) Ilioski	KTM									28	28	24	32	31	20					1
81	(Hungary) Szőke	Kawasaki									21	26									0
82	(Slovakia) Pravda	Yamaha													26	21					0
83	(Slovenia) Slavec	KTM									24	22	DNS	36							0
84	(Croatia) Šipek	Yamaha							22	24											0
85	(Bulgaria) Krastev	Yamaha					25	22													0
86	(Bulgaria) Totev	Honda					22	26													0
87	(Italy) Miori	Yamaha							26	22											0
88	(Austria) Machtlinger	KTM											26	22							0
89	(Slovakia) Drobec	Yamaha													27	22					0
90	(Germany) Hänchen	Honda																	27	22	0
91	(Bulgaria) Dobrev	Honda					23	23													0
92	(Netherlands) Hofstede	Honda	24	23																	0
93	(Croatia) Karas	Yamaha									23	24									0
94	(Slovakia) Popovicz	Honda											25	28	23	30					0
95	(Croatia) Božić	KTM									25	23									0
96	(France) Castets	Honda			25	24															0
97	(Bulgaria) Angelov	Yamaha					26	24													0
98	(Ukraine) Burenko	Suzuki																	28	24	0
99	(Slovakia) Ondria	Honda													38	24					0
100	(Slovakia) Kasala	KTM													24	DNS					0
101	(Belgium) Begon	Yamaha															25	DNS	34	30	0
102	(Finland) T. Mäkinen	KTM	25	31																	0
103	(Austria) Wimmer	Kawasaki											31	25							0
104	(Belgium) Engelen	Yamaha	DNS	25																	0
105	(Slovakia) Maniak	Suzuki													28	26					0
106	(Italy) Pasqua	KTM							29	26											0
107	(Belgium) van den Sanden	Honda	30	26																	0
108	(Austria) Schuster	Suzuki							35	27			27	34							0
109	(Netherlands) Nijs	Honda	27	28																	0
110	(Austria) Kainz	KTM											29	30	35	27					0
111	(France) Hellouin	Honda			30	27															0
112	(Croatia) Porobić	Yamaha									33	27									0
113	(Slovenia) Zver	Kawasaki									36	DNS	DNS	27							0
114	(Slovakia) Kohut	KTM													30	28					0
115	(Switzerland) Haller	Suzuki																	30	28	0
116	(Estonia) Havam	KTM			31	28															0
117	(Italy) Silvestri	Kawasaki							31	28											0
118	(Austria) Hauer	KTM									29	34									0
119	(Croatia) Kundid	Yamaha									35	29									0
120	(Netherlands) Klijn	Kawasaki	39	29																	0
121	(Czech Republic) Stránský	KTM													29	DNS					0
122	(Ukraine) Krychfalushiy	Yamaha																	29	DNS	0
123	(Croatia) Braim	Kawasaki									30	31									0
124	(Italy) Libera	Suzuki							30	33											0
125	(Croatia) Vitulić	Honda									31	33									0
126	(Slovakia) Šimko	KTM													36	31					0
127	(Denmark) Bogh	KTM	31	DNS																	0
128	(Finland) M. Mäkinen	KTM	DNS	32																	0
129	(Belgium) Renkens	Yamaha	33	37																	0
130	(Slovakia) Buchstabieber	KTM													DNS	33					0
131	(France) Barthes	Honda			35	34															0
132	(Slovakia) Valyik	KTM													DNS	34					0
133	(Netherlands) Blom	KTM	35	DNS																	0
134	(Sweden) Söderström	Honda	36	DNS																	0
135	(Slovakia) Hruška	KTM													37	DNS					0
136	(Estonia) Kaurit	Yamaha	40	DNS																	0
Pos	Rider	Bike	NED (Netherlands)		FRA (France)		BUL (Bulgaria)		ITA (Italy)		CRO (Croatia)		SLO (Slovenia)		SVK (Slovakia)		GBR (United Kingdom)		GER (Germany)		Pts

== Manufacturers' Championship ==
=== MX1 ===
Pos	Manufacturer	NED (Netherlands)		BUL (Bulgaria)		ITA (Italy)		MEX (Mexico)		BRA (Brazil)		FRA (France)		POR (Portugal)		BEL (Belgium)		SWE (Sweden)		LAT (Latvia)		RUS (Russia)		Loket (Czech Republic)		GBR (United Kingdom)		BEN (Benelux)		EUR (Europe)		GER (Germany)		Pts
1	(Austria) KTM	1	1	4	3	3	1	1	3	5	3	1	1	3	2	1	1	5	3	1	1	1	1	1	1	1	1	1	1	1	1	1	1	742
2	(Japan) Kawasaki	4	7	1	1	1	2	4	4	1	1	2	2	2	1	2	2	2	2	4	6	4	4	2	3	4	3	5	9	2	2	4	5	649
3	(Japan) Suzuki	2	2	3	8	4	3	2	2	13	2	5	4	1	3	3	3	1	1	6	4	3	2	4	2	6	8	4	3	3	4	2	4	617
4	(Japan) Honda	10	4	8	5	6	5	7	8	4	8	6	9	6	6	13	5	8	7	3	5	6	5	9	5	8	4	7	4	8	6	6	6	471
5	(Japan) Yamaha	3	3	5	9	8	8	10	1	2	6	8	5	10	9	7	12	4	5	8	8	13	11	8	9	13	10	8	5	5	10	12	11	439
6	(Italy) TM	20	29	31	30	18	13					16	11	17	15	12	15	28	15															58
Pos	Manufacturer	NED (Netherlands)		BUL (Bulgaria)		ITA (Italy)		MEX (Mexico)		BRA (Brazil)		FRA (France)		POR (Portugal)		BEL (Belgium)		SWE (Sweden)		LAT (Latvia)		RUS (Russia)		Loket (Czech Republic)		GBR (United Kingdom)		BEN (Benelux)		EUR (Europe)		GER (Germany)		Pts

=== MX2 ===
Pos	Manufacturer	NED (Netherlands)		BUL (Bulgaria)		ITA (Italy)		MEX (Mexico)		BRA (Brazil)		FRA (France)		POR (Portugal)		BEL (Belgium)		SWE (Sweden)		LAT (Latvia)		RUS (Russia)		Loket (Czech Republic)		GBR (United Kingdom)		BEN (Benelux)		EUR (Europe)		GER (Germany)		Pts
1	(Austria) KTM	1	1	2	2	1	1	1	1	3	2	1	2	1	2	1	2	1	2	2	1	1	1	1	1	2	2	1	1	1	1	3	2	757
2	(Japan) Kawasaki	2	2	1	1	5	2	2	2	1	1	3	1	3	1	2	1	2	1	1	2	3	2	2	3	1	1	4	4	2	2	1	1	721
3	(Japan) Yamaha	8	12	10	11	3	3	7	5	2	5	7	17	7	7	7	4	5	5	9	9	9	8	4	4	3	4	6	5	4	7	2	3	489
4	(Japan) Honda	7	5	6	5	11	8	8	9	4	7	12	7	10	3	26	25	7	13	11	4	25	7	5	10	20	10	3	3	12	8	9	11	382
5	(Japan) Suzuki	12	11	5	9	6	10	12	10	10	9	13	10	12	9	12	13	11	18	13	6	14	14	18	14	11	11	13	12	11	10	8	16	309
6	(Sweden) Husqvarna	13	13	14	6	14	6	11	11	11	8	16	6	28	10	10	9	40	10	12	10	10	19	7	17	14	19	11	11	16	16	10	19	271
7	(Italy) TM			26	17	20	21					19	19	24	21	20	28	20	32	24	21			17	20	18	29	19	28	17	17	22	29	29
Pos	Manufacturer	NED (Netherlands)		BUL (Bulgaria)		ITA (Italy)		MEX (Mexico)		BRA (Brazil)		FRA (France)		POR (Portugal)		BEL (Belgium)		SWE (Sweden)		LAT (Latvia)		RUS (Russia)		Loket (Czech Republic)		GBR (United Kingdom)		BEN (Benelux)		EUR (Europe)		GER (Germany)		Pts

=== MX3 ===
Pos	Manufacturer	NED (Netherlands)		FRA (France)		BUL (Bulgaria)		ITA (Italy)		CRO (Croatia)		SLO (Slovenia)		SVK (Slovakia)		GBR (United Kingdom)		GER (Germany)		Pts
1	(Austria) KTM	6	2	6	5	3	1	1	1	2	2	3	3	1	1	1	1	2	2	391
2	(Japan) Honda	3	4	1	2	1	2	3	2	1	4	1	1	2	3	2	2	4	5	383
3	(Japan) Suzuki	21	12	14	17	2	7	5	3	6	1	2	5	4	26	16	5	28	24	209
4	(Japan) Kawasaki	1	1	21	31			7	11	17	20	21	25	13	25	7	2	1	1	173
5	(Japan) Yamaha	15	13	2	1	14	13	11	20	15	16	6	12	11	13	11	22	10	8	172
6	(Italy) TM	10	9																	23
Pos	Manufacturer	NED (Netherlands)		FRA (France)		BUL (Bulgaria)		ITA (Italy)		CRO (Croatia)		SLO (Slovenia)		SVK (Slovakia)		GBR (United Kingdom)		GER (Germany)		Pts

== Participants ==
- Riders with red background numbers are defending champions. All riders were announced with numbers on February 7, 2012.

=== MX1 participants ===
Team	Constructor	No	Rider
Rockstar Energy Suzuki World MX1	Suzuki	4	(Estonia) Tanel Leok
Rockstar Energy Suzuki World MX1	Suzuki	25	(Belgium) Clément Desalle
LS Honda Racing	Honda	7	(Spain) Jonathan Barragan
LS Honda Racing	Honda	9	(Belgium) Ken De Dycker
TM Racing Factory Team	TM	10	(France) Boissiere Anthony
TEAM CP377 MONSTER ENERGY KAWASAKI PRO CIRCUIT	Kawasaki	11	(France) Sébastien Pourcel
TEAM CP377 MONSTER ENERGY KAWASAKI PRO CIRCUIT	Kawasaki	377	(France) Christophe Pourcel
RED BULL KTM FACTORY RACING	KTM	12	(Germany) Maximilian Nagl
RED BULL KTM FACTORY RACING	KTM	222	(Italy) Antonio Cairoli
Monster Energy Yamaha	Yamaha	19	(Italy) David Philippaerts
Monster Energy Yamaha	Yamaha	183	(France) Steven Frossard
Team2B	Yamaha	20	(France) Grégory Aranda
KAWASAKI RACING TEAM	Kawasaki	21	(France) Gautier Paulin
KAWASAKI RACING TEAM	Kawasaki	121	(France) Xavier Boog
HM Plant KTM UK	KTM	22	(Belgium) Kevin Strijbos
Monster Energy Factory Yamaha	Yamaha	24	(United Kingdom) Shaun Simpson
HONDA FRANCE HDI MX TEAM	Honda	32	(France) Milko Potisek
HONDA FRANCE HDI MX TEAM	Honda	120	(France) Cedric Souberyras
Marchetti Racing	KTM	36	(Italy) Matteo Bonnini
KTM Silver Action	KTM	39	(Italy) Davide Guarneri
KTM Silver Action	KTM	611	(Moldova) Mihai Cociu
Team STR KTM	KTM	42	(United Kingdom) Nathan Parker
Team STR KTM	KTM	91	(Latvia) Matiss Karro
JK Gebben Yamaha	Yamaha	61	(Netherlands) Herjan Brakke
ICE1RACING	Kawasaki	67	(Finland) Santtu Tiainen
ICE1RACING	Kawasaki	111	(Australia) Dean Ferris
RIGA MOTOCROSS TEAM	Kawasaki	74	(Latvia) Ivo Steinbergs
KTM SCOTT RACING	KTM	79	(Germany) Lars Oldekamp
Latvia Elksni Honda	Honda	95	(Latvia) Augusts Justs
Latvia Elksni Honda	Honda	99	(Latvia) Kristers Teko
Honda World Motocross Team	Honda	777	(Russia) Evgeny Borbryshev
Honda World Motocross Team	Honda	999	(Portugal) Rui Goncalves
Sturm Racing Team	Kawasaki		TBC
Sturm Racing Team	Kawasaki		TBC

Key
Regular Rider
Wildcard Rider
Replacement Rider

=== MX2 participants ===
Team	Constructor	No	Rider
HONDA GARIBOLDI - ESTA	Honda	6	(United Kingdom) Max Anstie
HONDA GARIBOLDI - ESTA	Honda	66	(Russia) Aleksandr Tonkov
Monster Energy Factory Yamaha	Yamaha	7	(Switzerland) Arnaud Tonus
Monster Energy Factory Yamaha	Yamaha	338	(United States) Zachary Osborne
JTECH Racing	Yamaha	12	(Italy) Simone Zecchina
JTECH Racing	Yamaha	101	(Italy) Samuel Zeni
DIGA RACING	KTM	17	(Spain) José Butrón
DIGA RACING	KTM	221	(Estonia) Priit Rätsep
LIEBER Racing Team	KTM	19	(Belgium) Cédric Lieber
LIEBER Racing Team	KTM	33	(Belgium) Julien Lieber
ROCKSTAR BUD RACING KAWASAKI	Kawasaki	22	(France) Dylan Ferrandis
ROCKSTAR BUD RACING KAWASAKI	Kawasaki	37	(France) Valentin Teillet
Monster Energy Yamaha	Yamah	23	(France) Christophe Charlier
NESTAAN JM RACING KTM	KTM	25	(Netherlands) Glenn Coldenhof
NESTAAN JM RACING KTM	KTM	35	(Austria) Pascal Rauchenecker
NESTAAN JM RACING KTM	KTM	45	(United Kingdom) Jake Nicholls
TEAM FLORIDE MONSTER ENERGY KAWASAKI PRO CIRCUIT	Kawasaki	34	(Belgium) Joel Roelants
TEAM FLORIDE MONSTER ENERGY KAWASAKI PRO CIRCUIT	Kawasaki	100	(United Kingdom) Tommy Searle
Standing Construct Suzuki World MX2	Suzuki	51	(Belgium) Jens Getteman
Standing Construct Suzuki World MX2	Suzuki	249	(Denmark) Nikolaj Larsen
Husqvarna Ricci Racing	Husqvarna	77	(Italy) Alessandro Lupino
Husqvarna Ricci Racing	Husqvarna	590	(Belgium) Nick Triest
RED BULL KTM FACTORY RACING	KTM	84	(Netherlands) Jeffrey Herlings
RED BULL KTM FACTORY RACING	KTM	89	(Belgium) Jeremy van Horebeek
RED BULL KTM FACTORY RACING	KTM	911	(France) Jordi Tixier
KEMEA-Reytec-Yamaha Racing Team	Yamaha	103	(Belgium) Kenny Vandueren
KEMEA-Reytec-Yamaha Racing Team	Yamaha	922	(Belgium) Kevin Fors
KTM SCOTT RACING	KTM	112	(Norway) Even Heibye
KTM SCOTT RACING	KTM	173	(Switzerland) Valentin Guillod
SKS Polned TM Factory Racing	TM	141	(Italy) Andrea Cervellin
SKS Polned TM Factory Racing	TM	824	(Netherlands) Nick Kouwenberg
SUZUKI Europe MX 2	Suzuki	151	(Finland) Harri Kullas
SUZUKI Europe MX 2	Suzuki	152	(Bulgaria) Petar Petrov
Latvia Elksni Honda	Honda	195	(Latvia) Roberts Justs
Marchetti Racing	KTM	262	(Italy) Giacomo Del Segato
RIGA MOTOCROSS TEAM	Kawasaki	300	(Russia) Viacheslav Golovkin
RIGA MOTOCROSS TEAM	Kawasaki	600	(Latvia) Davis Ivanovs

Key
Regular Rider
Wildcard Rider
Replacement Rider
