= 2010 FIM Motocross World Championship =

Sports season

2010 Motocross World Championship

Seasons
- ← 2009 2011 →

The 2010 FIM Motocross World Championship was the 54th season of World Championship motocross competition. It consisted of three different classes; MX1 and MX2 classes over 15 events beginning on April 4 in Sevlievo, Bulgaria and ending on September 12 in Fermo, Italy, and MX3 over 12 events also beginning on April 4 in Cortelha, Portugal and ending on September 5 in Geneva, Switzerland.

Red Bull KTM Factory Racing's Antonio Cairoli dominated the MX1 class, taking exactly half of the victories on offer; 15 victories and 23 podiums in total allowed him to claim his second successive championship title by 88 points, scoring points in all bar two races. Clément Desalle took a career-best second-place finish in the standings, riding for the Teka Suzuki team. Desalle took victories at Mantova, Ķegums and Fermo as he finished 35 points clear of the top-placed Yamaha rider in the championship, David Philippaerts of the Yamaha Monster Energy Motocross Team. Philippaerts won just two races during the season – at Saint-Jean-d'Angély and Campo Grande – but finished each of the season's 30 races within the points-awarding placings as he held off Cairoli's team-mate Maximilian Nagl, a four-time race-winner, by four points. The top five was completed by Fermo race-winner Steve Ramon, seven points behind Nagl. Other victories were taken by Honda's Tanel Leok at Bellpuig and Loket, Yamaha's Ken De Dycker who took a double at Teutschenthal and Ben Townley, who made a one-off appearance for Honda at Glen Helen. KTM won the Manufacturers' Championship by 67 points ahead of Suzuki.

MX2 was also won by a rider from the Red Bull KTM Factory Racing team, as Marvin Musquin repeated the feat of Cairoli in MX1, by defending the season-end red plate for the championship winner. Musquin started the season with consecutive doubles at Sevlievo and Mantova before adding further doubles at Águeda, Glen Helen and Saint-Jean-d'Angély en route to a grand total of 14 victories, 23 podiums and a championship-winning margin of 61 points over runner-up Ken Roczen of the Teka Suzuki team. Roczen took ten victories during the season, eight of which coming during the final eleven races of the season. Third place went to Kawasaki Team CLS rider Steven Frossard, who claimed ten podium places but only had one win to show from it, coming at Uddevalla in Sweden. The top five was rounded out by Yamaha UK's Zach Osborne and JM Racing Team KTM's Joel Roelants, who took several podiums each but failed to win a race. Only two other riders took victories during the season; KTM's Jeffrey Herlings took four but slipped to sixth in the championship after missing the final three events due to a shoulder injury, and Yamaha's Gautier Paulin, who took a sole victory at Lierop during a part-season. KTM won the Manufacturers' Championship by 88 points ahead of Suzuki.

MX3 was between two riders, who did battle for the title on their respective machinery. Yamaha's Carlos Campano and Husqvarna's Alex Salvini shared 18 of the season's 24 race wins between them, but it was Campana that prevailed for the championship, by 24 points. Campano's advantage over another Husqvarna rider and third place championship finisher Matevz Irt was 150 points; Irt having claimed seven podium finishes without success. The top five was completed by Martin Zerava and Milko Potisek, with Potisek claiming a race win at Schwedt in Germany, during the season. Other victories were taken by riders during one-off appearances; Mickaël Pichon and Julien Bill claimed doubles at their respective home events at Castelnau-de-Lévis and Geneva, while Toni Eriksson took one win at Vantaa. Yamaha won the Manufacturers' Championship by just 15 points over Husqvarna.

== Rule changes ==
- A maximum of 26 riders will be entered for the entire FIM MX1 World Championship, and in addition 2 FMNR wild card riders and another 2 wild card riders (which Youthstream will use in order to support teams’ and local organisers’ requests for extra riders) will be entered per event. The Regulations allow up to 40 riders, but to increase the quality, the FIM want to try to keep MX1 with a maximum of 30 riders. The MX2 class will be for riders less than 23 years old. The FIM will only accept teams with 2 riders in one class.

== 2010 Calendar ==
The 2010 calendars of the FIM Motocross World Championships promoted by Youthstream were finalised on 29 October 2009. In February 2010, there was some changes in the calendar.

Round	Date	Grand Prix	Location	Race 1 Winner	Race 2 Winner	Round Winner
MX1
1	April 4	Bulgaria	Sevlievo	(Germany) Maximilian Nagl	(Italy) Antonio Cairoli	(Germany) Maximilian Nagl
2	April 11	(Italy) Lombardia	Mantova	(Belgium) Clément Desalle	(Italy) Antonio Cairoli	(Italy) Antonio Cairoli
3	April 25	Netherlands	Valkenswaard	(Italy) Antonio Cairoli	(Italy) Antonio Cairoli	(Italy) Antonio Cairoli
4	May 9	Portugal	Águeda	(Germany) Maximilian Nagl	(Italy) Antonio Cairoli	(Belgium) Clément Desalle
5	May 16	(Catalonia) Catalunya	Bellpuig	(Germany) Maximilian Nagl	(Estonia) Tanel Leok	(Estonia) Tanel Leok
6	May 30	United States	Glen Helen	(Italy) Antonio Cairoli	(New Zealand) Ben Townley	(Italy) Antonio Cairoli
7	June 6	France	Saint-Jean-d'Angély	(Italy) Antonio Cairoli	(Italy) David Philippaerts	(Italy) David Philippaerts
8	June 20	Germany	Teutschenthal	(Belgium) Ken De Dycker	(Belgium) Ken De Dycker	(Belgium) Ken De Dycker
9	June 27	Latvia	Ķegums	(Belgium) Clément Desalle	(Italy) Antonio Cairoli	(Belgium) Clément Desalle
10	July 4	Sweden	Uddevalla	(Italy) Antonio Cairoli	(Italy) Antonio Cairoli	(Italy) Antonio Cairoli
11	August 1	(Belgium) Limburg	Lommel	(Italy) Antonio Cairoli	(Italy) Antonio Cairoli	(Italy) Antonio Cairoli
12	August 8	Czech Republic	Loket	(Estonia) Tanel Leok	(Italy) Antonio Cairoli	(Italy) Antonio Cairoli
13	August 22	Brazil	Campo Grande	(Italy) David Philippaerts	(Italy) Antonio Cairoli	(Italy) Antonio Cairoli
14	September 5	Benelux	Lierop	(Germany) Maximilian Nagl	(Italy) Antonio Cairoli	(Italy) Antonio Cairoli
15	September 12	Italy	Fermo	(Belgium) Steve Ramon	(Belgium) Clément Desalle	(Belgium) Clément Desalle
MX2
1	April 4	Bulgaria	Sevlievo	(France) Marvin Musquin	(France) Marvin Musquin	(France) Marvin Musquin
2	April 11	(Italy) Lombardia	Mantova	(France) Marvin Musquin	(France) Marvin Musquin	(France) Marvin Musquin
3	April 25	Netherlands	Valkenswaard	(Netherlands) Jeffrey Herlings	(Netherlands) Jeffrey Herlings	(Netherlands) Jeffrey Herlings
4	May 9	Portugal	Águeda	(France) Marvin Musquin	(France) Marvin Musquin	(France) Marvin Musquin
5	May 16	(Catalonia) Catalunya	Bellpuig	(Germany) Ken Roczen	(France) Marvin Musquin	(France) Marvin Musquin
6	May 30	United States	Glen Helen	(France) Marvin Musquin	(France) Marvin Musquin	(France) Marvin Musquin
7	June 6	France	Saint-Jean-d'Angély	(France) Marvin Musquin	(France) Marvin Musquin	(France) Marvin Musquin
8	June 20	Germany	Teutschenthal	(France) Marvin Musquin	(Germany) Ken Roczen	(France) Marvin Musquin
9	June 27	Latvia	Ķegums	(France) Marvin Musquin	(Netherlands) Jeffrey Herlings	(Netherlands) Jeffrey Herlings
10	July 4	Sweden	Uddevalla	(France) Steven Frossard	(Germany) Ken Roczen	(France) Steven Frossard
11	August 1	(Belgium) Limburg	Lommel	(Germany) Ken Roczen	(Netherlands) Jeffrey Herlings	(Germany) Ken Roczen
12	August 8	Czech Republic	Loket	(Germany) Ken Roczen	(France) Marvin Musquin	(France) Marvin Musquin
13	August 22	Brazil	Campo Grande	(Germany) Ken Roczen	(Germany) Ken Roczen	(Germany) Ken Roczen
14	September 5	Benelux	Lierop	(France) Gautier Paulin	(Germany) Ken Roczen	(France) Gautier Paulin
15	September 12	Italy	Fermo	(Germany) Ken Roczen	(Germany) Ken Roczen	(Germany) Ken Roczen
MX3
1	April 4	Portugal	Cortelha	(Spain) Carlos Campano	(Spain) Carlos Campano	(Spain) Carlos Campano
2	April 11	France	Castelnau-de-Lévis	(France) Mickaël Pichon	(France) Mickaël Pichon	(France) Mickaël Pichon
3	May 2	Argentina	La Rioja	(Italy) Alex Salvini	(Spain) Carlos Campano	(Spain) Carlos Campano
4	May 23	Bulgaria	Troyan	(Italy) Alex Salvini	(Spain) Carlos Campano	(Italy) Alex Salvini
5	May 30	Greece	Megalopolis	(Italy) Alex Salvini	(Italy) Alex Salvini	(Italy) Alex Salvini
6	June 13	Czech Republic	Holice	(Italy) Alex Salvini	(Spain) Carlos Campano	(Spain) Carlos Campano
7	June 20	Slovakia	Šenkvice	(Spain) Carlos Campano	(Italy) Alex Salvini	(Spain) Carlos Campano
8	July 4	Spain	La Bañeza	(Spain) Carlos Campano	(Italy) Alex Salvini	(France) Milko Potisek
9	July 11	Slovenia	Orehova Vas	(Spain) Carlos Campano	(Spain) Carlos Campano	(Spain) Carlos Campano
10	August 1	Germany	Schwedt	(France) Milko Potisek	(Spain) Carlos Campano	(Spain) Carlos Campano
11	August 22	Finland	Vantaa	(Finland) Toni Eriksson	(Spain) Carlos Campano	(Spain) Carlos Campano
12	September 5	Switzerland	Geneva	(Switzerland) Julien Bill	(Switzerland) Julien Bill	(Switzerland) Julien Bill

== Championship standings ==
=== MX1 ===
==== Riders' Championship ====
(key)

Pos	Rider	Bike	BUL (Bulgaria)		LOM (Lombardy)		NED (Netherlands)		POR (Portugal)		CAT (Catalonia)		USA (United States)		FRA (France)		GER (Germany)		LAT (Latvia)		SWE (Sweden)		LIM (Belgium)		CZE (Czech Republic)		BRA (Brazil)		BEN (Benelux)		ITA (Italy)		Pts
1	(Italy) Cairoli	KTM	5	1	2	1	1	1	5	1	6	3	1	3	1	3	6	2	4	1	1	1	1	1	2	1	2	1	2	1	33	DNS	625
2	(Belgium) Desalle	Suzuki	3	5	1	4	33	DNS	2	2	3	6	5	2	4	2	3	3	1	2	2	2	3	4	3	2	3	17	10	9	4	1	537
3	(Italy) Philippaerts	Yamaha	2	7	19	2	2	4	3	8	2	5	11	18	3	1	2	5	5	6	3	8	4	6	4	9	1	2	5	5	7	6	502
4	(Germany) Nagl	KTM	1	2	3	3	4	6	1	5	1	9	3	DSQ	DNS	DNS	5	7	7	7	6	6	2	3	5	4	4	3	1	4	6	3	498
5	(Belgium) Ramon	Suzuki	7	3	10	7	3	2	7	12	15	7	7	6	2	5	7	9	3	3	4	3	5	11	6	3	7	4	3	3	1	4	491
6	(Estonia) Leok	Honda	12	17	9	16	5	3	6	6	7	1	32	26	6	9	10	12	9	8	29	9	13	2	1	5	8	10	4	7	15	17	356
7	(France) Boog	Kawasaki	8	9	7	6	11	15	4	4	13	2	6	5	31	7	4	4	6	5	9	5	DNS	DNS			24	6	13	33	2	5	337
8	(Belgium) De Dycker	Yamaha	4	8	4	5	6	7	36	3	8	4	4	10	9	6	1	1	10	14	DNS	DNS	7	5	11	30			6	35	14	29	331
9	(Italy) Guarneri	Honda	10	12	13	17	7	11	15	10	10	27	8	7	5	8	11	6	8	10	26	14	11	14	37	DNS	5	8	9	8	8	11	290
10	(Russia) Bobryshev	Honda	DNS	15	14	9	9	5	9	7	5	10	12	28	13	29	8	8	2	4	5	4	12	9	9	7	DNS	DNS					270
11	(Portugal) Goncalves	KTM					17	19	11	13	16	12	16	11	14	12	18	11	11	9	12	10	6	7	10	8	6	5	7	2	9	8	269
12	(New Zealand) Coppins	Aprilia	9	10	17	11	34	9	17	11	14	13	35	9	12	14	14	33	14	30	11	11	9	8	13	10	9	7	11	10	10	7	256
13	(Belgium) Strijbos	Suzuki	15	23	28	12	14	12	12	14	11	8	13	13	8	11	9	27	16	13	8	7	10	12	16	6							201
14	(South Africa) Swanepoel	Honda	11	13	15	14	12	10	20	16	23	11	14	29	11	13	13	10	15	12	7	12	8	10	12	28							182
15	(France) Pourcel	Kawasaki	33	4	5	18	16	13	8	9	30	DNS	30	32	15	10	33	DNS					32	31	7	33			30	12	3	2	157
16	(France) Boissière	TM	39	11	32	10	19	32	13	15	4	14	34	8	7	4	12	32	13	11	10	29											145
17	(United States) Albertson	Honda	16	20	6	13	8	8	30	17	DNS	DNS	DNS	DNS			15	13	12	32	27	28	DNS	DNS	24	13	10	9	34	DNS	13	12	130
18	(Spain) Barragan	Kawasaki	6	6	8	8																	14	13	14	37			12	11	5	30	113
19	(Netherlands) de Reuver	Suzuki	14	33	12	23	10	21	10	19	22	22	25	23			35	34					16	27	19	19			8	6	12	14	93
20	(France) Aubin	Kawasaki							14	31	9	21	15	14	10	15					28	13	21	36	8	35			DNS	DNS	37	DNS	70
21	(France) Soubeyras	KTM	19	18	20	19	18	27	19	18	17	15	20	16	16	27	16	20	18	18	23	22	22	20	15	18			32	30	17	18	66
22	(Italy) Monni	Yamaha	13	14	11	15	13	14	33	DNS																					16	9	63
23	(Austria) Walkner	KTM	22	22	33	21	21	16			25	20	18	15	17	18	21	15	31	15	16	20	18	19	23	14			20	34	24	26	53
24	(Sweden) Söderström	Yamaha	18	36	16	32	15	33	16	33	DNS	DNS			27	33	27	17	17	17	13	17	36	DNS	26	17							47
25	(United States) Alessi	KTM											2	4																			40
26	(United Kingdom) Church	CCM	17	26	18	29	31	17																	17	11			14	14			39
27	(Brazil) A. Balbi	Kawasaki											19	25													11	11			20	13	31
28	(Italy) Bonini	Yamaha	29	29	31	33	23	23	26	34	18	24			18	16	36	23	32	23	19	18	34	23	29	15			18	26	22	15	31
29	(Belgium) Wouts	Kawasaki	28	28	24	20	22	28	18	26	26	19	22	20	29	28	24	29	33	33	20	16	31	17	38	36			17	13	23	28	29
30	(Belgium) Priem	Aprilia	36	DNS													34	18	30	16	14	25	15	33	21	34			33	15	21	32	27
31	(France) Aranda	Kawasaki	27	16	DNS	DNS			31	32	DNS	DNS																			11	10	26
32	(New Zealand) Townley	Honda											33	1																			25
33	(United States) Chisolm	Yamaha											10	12																			20
34	(Switzerland) Bill	Aprilia	38	19	DNS	34			22	20	21	17			19	26																	18
34	(Switzerland) Bill	KTM																							34	12							18
35	(Austria) G. Schmidinger	Suzuki	25	25	23	22	26	20	27	25	19	28			23	21	25	21	19	20	15	15	26	32	DNS	DNS			24	21	26	21	18
36	(Belgium) Martens	KTM	26	37	22	25	20	18					26	33							17	27	33	15					31	17			18
37	(Brazil) Paulino	Honda																									13	12					17
38	(Czech Republic) Neugebauer	Kawasaki	20	21					25	21	20	18			21	30	19	16					23	30	18	26							15
39	(Costa Rica) Castro	Kawasaki																									12	16					14
40	(Spain) Lozano	Yamaha									12	16																					14
41	(Argentina) Felipe	Kawasaki																									16	13					13
42	(Brazil) Zenni	Honda																									14	15					13
43	(South Africa) Langston	Yamaha											9	31																			12
44	(Germany) Schiffer	Suzuki																											19	18	18	19	10
45	(Australia) Ferris	Honda															22	14											29	31	19	27	9
46	(South Africa) Terreblanche	Kawasaki	24	27	34	DNS									26	19	17	19	DNS	DNS									36	22			8
47	(France) Bellino	KTM	21	34	21	31	27	30	23	22	24	23			20	20	23	DNS					17	35	20	20			DNS	DNS	27	DNS	8
48	(Brazil) Garcia	Honda																									23	14					7
49	(Spain) Butrón	Suzuki																											25	19	25	16	7
50	(Netherlands) van Vijfeijken	Yamaha					24	29															20	22					16	20			7
51	(Brazil) Lima	Kawasaki																									15	22					6
52	(Netherlands) Verhoeven	Honda	37	30	25	24	DNS	DNS																					15	32			6
53	(Brazil) Müller	Kawasaki																									18	18					6
54	(France) Leonce	Suzuki													22	31	20	22	20	24	18	26	28	21	35	31			23	27	32	20	6
55	(Netherlands) Brakke	Yamaha																											21	16	DNS	DNS	5
56	(United Kingdom) Sword	CCM	35	DNS																					22	16							5
57	(United Kingdom) Anderson	Honda																					35	16									5
58	(United States) Garrison	Husqvarna											21	17																			4
59	(Brazil) Parise	Kawasaki																									17	23					4
60	(United States) Hughes	Honda											17	30																			4
61	(France) Potisek	Honda													33	17																	4
62	(Uruguay) Cerdeña	Kawasaki																									19	19					4
63	(Estonia) Krestinov	KTM	23	38																													3
63	(Estonia) Krestinov	Kawasaki																					24	18									3
64	(Sweden) Sandberg	Kawasaki	31	32	29	27	DNS	DNS	35	28	28	25			28	24	29	25	25	31	22	19	25	28	28	25			26	28	31	33	2
65	(Russia) Parshin	Honda																	23	19													2
66	(United States) Soule	Kawasaki											23	19																			2
67	(Netherlands) Reijnders	Suzuki																					19	25									2
68	(Brazil) M. Balbi	Yamaha																									20	20					2
	(Latvia) Steinbergs	Honda					29	26	29	27	27	29	27	22	25	23	28	24	21	21	21	23	27	24	36	22			22	23	35	DNS	0
	(Uruguay) Balduvino	Kawasaki																									21	21					0
	(Portugal) Correia	Yamaha							21	23																							0
	(United States) Stapleton	Honda											24	21																			0
	(Latvia) Justs	Honda																					30	34	27	21			35	25	DNS	DNS	0
	(Sweden) Norlen	Honda																			25	21											0
	(Czech Republic) Michek	TM	34	24	26	26	25	22	24	30					30	22																	0
	(Latvia) Freibergs	Honda																	22	22													0
	(France) Jacquelin	Suzuki	30	35	30	28	28	24	28	24																			27	29	30	22	0
	(Brazil) Silva	Honda																									22	24					0
	(Czech Republic) Smola	Suzuki																							25	23							0
	(United Kingdom) Smith	Aprilia																					29	26	33	29			37	DNS	28	23	0
	(Sweden) Johnsson	Kawasaki																			24	24											0
	(France) Demeure	KTM													24	25	32	28															0
	(Latvia) Macuks	Honda																	24	28													0
	(Netherlands) van Rooij	Kawasaki																											28	24			0
	(Japan) Hirata	Honda																					37	29	30	24							0
	(United States) Phenix	Yamaha											29	24																			0
	(Italy) Pedri	Honda																													29	24	0
	(Latvia) Kempelis	Honda	32	31	27	30	32	25	32	29	29	26																					0
	(Latvia) Ivanovs	KTM																	26	25													0
	(Italy) Bertuccelli	KTM																													36	25	0
	(Latvia) Apfelbaums	Honda																	28	26													0
	(Austria) A. Schmidinger	Honda															30	26															0
	(Germany) Albrecht	Yamaha															26	31															0
	(Lithuania) Bucas	Honda																	27	27													0
	(France) Degousee	TM																							31	27							0
	(United States) Gassin	Yamaha											36	27																			0
	(United States) Sipes	Yamaha											28	DNS																			0
	(Japan) Suzuki	Honda																	29	29													0
	(France) Rombaut	Kawasaki					30	31																									0
	(Germany) Sturm	Kawasaki															31	30															0
	(Spain) Campano	Yamaha																													34	31	0
	(United States) Laninovich	Aprilia									31	DNS																					0
	(United States) Dietrich	Kawasaki											31	DNS																			0
	(France) Sandouly	Yamaha													32	32																	0
	(Switzerland) Wicht	Honda																							32	32							0
	(Portugal) Santos	Kawasaki							34	DNS																							0
	(United Kingdom) Clarke	Suzuki																					38	DNS									0
	(Argentina) Correa	Kawasaki																									DNS	DNS					0
Pos	Rider	Bike	BUL (Bulgaria)		LOM (Lombardy)		NED (Netherlands)		POR (Portugal)		CAT (Catalonia)		USA (United States)		FRA (France)		GER (Germany)		LAT (Latvia)		SWE (Sweden)		LIM (Belgium)		CZE (Czech Republic)		BRA (Brazil)		BEN (Benelux)		ITA (Italy)		Pts

==== Manufacturers' Championship ====
Pos	Manufacturer	BUL (Bulgaria)		LOM (Lombardy)		NED (Netherlands)		POR (Portugal)		CAT (Catalonia)		USA (United States)		FRA (France)		GER (Germany)		LAT (Latvia)		SWE (Sweden)		LIM (Belgium)		CZE (Czech Republic)		BRA (Brazil)		BEN (Benelux)		ITA (Italy)		Pts
1	(Austria) KTM	1	1	2	1	1	1	1	1	1	3	1	3	1	3	5	2	4	1	1	1	1	1	2	1	2	1	1	1	6	3	692
2	(Japan) Suzuki	3	3	1	4	3	2	2	2	3	6	5	2	2	2	3	3	1	2	2	2	3	4	3	2	3	4	3	3	1	1	625
3	(Japan) Yamaha	2	7	4	2	2	4	3	3	2	4	4	10	3	1	1	1	5	6	3	8	4	5	4	9	1	2	5	5	7	6	556
4	(Japan) Honda	10	12	6	9	5	3	6	6	5	1	8	1	5	8	8	6	2	4	5	4	8	2	1	5	5	8	4	7	8	11	483
5	(Japan) Kawasaki	6	4	5	6	11	13	4	4	9	2	6	5	10	7	4	4	6	5	9	5	14	13	7	25	11	6	12	11	2	2	420
6	(Italy) Aprilia	9	10	17	11	34	9	17	11	14	13	35	9	12	14	14	18	14	16	11	11	9	8	13	10	9	7	11	10	10	7	264
7	(Italy) TM	34	11	26	10	19	22	13	15	4	14	34	8	7	4	12	32	13	11	10	29			31	27							145
8	(United Kingdom) CCM	17	26	18	29	31	17																	17	11			14	14			39
9	(Sweden) Husqvarna											21	17																			4
Pos	Manufacturer	BUL (Bulgaria)		LOM (Lombardy)		NED (Netherlands)		POR (Portugal)		CAT (Catalonia)		USA (United States)		FRA (France)		GER (Germany)		LAT (Latvia)		SWE (Sweden)		LIM (Belgium)		CZE (Czech Republic)		BRA (Brazil)		BEN (Benelux)		ITA (Italy)		Pts

Colour	Result
Gold	Winner
Silver	Second place
Bronze	Third place
Green	Points classification
Blue	Non-points classification
Blue	Non-classified finish (NC)
Purple	Retired, not classified (Ret)
Red	Did not qualify (DNQ)
Red	Did not pre-qualify (DNPQ)
Black	Disqualified (DSQ)
White	Did not start (DNS)
White	Withdrew (WD)
White	Race cancelled (C)
Blank	Did not practice (DNP)
Blank	Did not arrive (DNA)
Blank	Excluded (EX)

=== MX2 ===
==== Riders' Championship ====
(key)

Pos	Rider	Bike	BUL (Bulgaria)		LOM (Lombardy)		NED (Netherlands)		POR (Portugal)		CAT (Catalonia)		USA (United States)		FRA (France)		GER (Germany)		LAT (Latvia)		SWE (Sweden)		LIM (Belgium)		CZE (Czech Republic)		BRA (Brazil)		BEN (Benelux)		ITA (Italy)		Pts
1	(France) Musquin	KTM	1	1	1	1	8	5	1	1	7	1	1	1	1	1	1	2	1	7	4	5	2	3	2	1	2	2	3	2	2	27	635
2	(Germany) Roczen	Suzuki	2	2	2	3	2	2	2	6	1	30	3	5	16	7	5	1	2	3	28	1	1	2	1	2	1	1	34	1	1	1	574
3	(France) Frossard	Kawasaki	3	4	3	10	4	3	11	5	2	11	2	4	4	14	3	4	4	2	1	2	10	8	14	4	11	5	5	30	11	2	478
4	(United States) Osborne	Yamaha	8	7	5	5	10	13	5	3	12	31	4	2	3	9	4	3	27	5	7	9	17	10	11	8	4	9	11	6	8	5	397
5	(Belgium) Roelants	KTM	9	36	8	34	7	6	8	8	5	2	13	13	5	3	8	30	5	6	8	8	4	5	9	9	7	7	2	4	6	6	396
6	(Netherlands) Herlings	KTM	6	3	6	2	1	1	3	2	3	34	8	27	2	12	DSQ	8	3	1	2	4	3	1	3	37							391
7	(Switzerland) Tonus	Suzuki	4	5	11	4	5	9	9	7	13	15	7	11	8	5	6	5	12	8	14	33	8	11	8	7	3	6	6	8	5	4	390
8	(United Kingdom) Simpson	KTM	7	9	7	8	3	7	4	21	6	4	9	3	12	2	9	9	8	13	9	11	5	7	5	6	24	DNS	4	7	15	29	367
9	(Belgium) van Horebeek	Kawasaki	5	6	4	18	11	4	18	4	8	7	5	8	9	17	2	7	25	DNS	3	6	9	9	4	5	6	3	29	13	3	37	365
10	(France) Paulin	Yamaha									4	10	11	9	14	4	7	11	7	4	5	3	7	4	6	3	23	4	1	3	4	3	336
11	(Finland) Kullas	Yamaha	11	12	9	13	9	11	7	13	10	6	28	10	11	8	14	13	6	12	6	15	6	6	10	11	5	11	7	5	12	11	329
12	(France) Charlier	Yamaha	14	10	35	7	6	8	6	15	DNS	DNS			6	11	12	6	10	9	10	14	36	13	7	36	8	8	18	26	9	10	245
13	(United Kingdom) Nicholls	KTM	10	8	13	6	20	10	16	9	9	5	10	7	15	13	10	17	13	10	18	12	30	12	28	33	22	22	13	10	10	8	241
14	(Italy) Lupino	Yamaha	16	15	12	17	35	14	17	11	16	3	16	15	13	10	17	14	21	22	11	13	35	30	16	12	10	10	16	18	13	9	193
15	(Belgium) Verbruggen	KTM	12	19	14	9	13	12	19	10	14	9	14	6	10	6	DNS	DNS	22	27			13	29	15	14			14	32	18	13	166
16	(Latvia) Karro	Suzuki	20	20	16	12	DNS	15	10	14	15	14	15	12	18	35	29	31	14	15	33	10	12	20	12	15			10	DNS	16	25	136
17	(France) Teillet	KTM	33	34	15	30			21	12	11	8	12	DSQ	35	15	15	15	9	14	12	36	34	33	38	10			12	9	DNS	DNS	125
18	(Denmark) Larsen	Honda	18	14	18	29	14	20	12	17	18	13			20	19	37	16	16	24	17	20	14	16	34	16			17	12	17	12	106
19	(United States) Leib	Kawasaki									37	35	26	26	38	DNS	34	10	26	11	13	7	24	23	39	DNS	9	21	36	31	7	7	83
20	(Belgium) Triest	KTM	13	11	30	DNS	26	36	23	23	17	21			24	26	35	29	15	16	25	28	16	15	20	19			8	15	20	28	67
21	(United Kingdom) Pocock	Yamaha	15	18	17	31	16	21	13	18	23	22			17	20	21	19	17	17	26	16	28	18	37	29			20	16	26	17	62
22	(France) Vongsana	TM	37	32	33	26	22	17	34	16	25	20																					58
22	(France) Vongsana	KTM													7	30	11	12	11	25	16	27											58
23	(Netherlands) Coldenhoff	Yamaha	19	38																			15	17	18	31			9	14	19	18	39
24	(Czech Republic) Michek	TM															13	33			21	23	32	DNS	13	13			37	28	14	14	38
25	(Netherlands) Klein Kromhof	Yamaha	17	37	DNS	DNS	30	DNS	26	35	21	16			25	32	33	22	29	DNS	20	31	11	14	35	35			15	34	31	26	33
26	(Czech Republic) Smitka	KTM	26	17	22	14	15	18	15	20	19	32	19	19	DNS	DNS															35	30	33
27	(Russia) Tonkov	Suzuki	25	27			17	33	14	25	28	17			33	33	16	21	18	18	19	35	22	22									28
28	(Spain) Butrón	Suzuki	21	21	19	11	19	34									20	20	19	20	34	24	26	19	19	18							26
29	(France) Larrieu	Yamaha					12	16	22	19	27	23	DNS	DNS	37	18	18	18	30	DNS													25
30	(United Kingdom) Chatfield	Kawasaki																									12	12					18
31	(France) Alletru	KTM	35	31	27	16	33	35	20	32	20	18			19	16	23	32	31	DNS													17
32	(United States) Baker	Yamaha											6	22																			15
33	(Brazil) Castro	Yamaha																									13	14					15
34	(Netherlands) van Wezel	KTM					21	19																					22	11			12
35	(Germany) Schiffer	KTM	38	22	10	27																											11
36	(France) Aubin	Kawasaki	DSQ	13	23	32	18	32																									11
37	(Bulgaria) Petrov	Honda	34	25	24	24	25	23	24	29	30	37			30	27	26	25	20	19	35	22	23	21	21	17			30	17	21	24	11
38	(Brazil) Zanoni	Honda																									19	13					10
39	(Belgium) Delince	KTM																			15	21			17	22							10
40	(Brazil) Lima	Kawasaki																									15	17					10
41	(France) Dagod	KTM					38	30	27	22	22	12			26	34																	9
42	(United Kingdom) Anstie	Yamaha											17	16																			9
43	(Brazil) Cidade	Yamaha																									17	16					9
44	(Brazil) Villardi	KTM																									14	20					8
45	(United States) Friese	Yamaha											20	14																			8
46	(Brazil) Müller	Kawasaki																									16	18					8
47	(Venezuela) Martin	Kawasaki																									20	15					7
48	(Italy) Martini	Honda			29	15																									33	32	6
49	(Belgium) J. Lieber	Suzuki																													36	15	6
50	(Italy) Philippaerts	Suzuki	32	24	34	20	29	31	28	33					31	21	25	34													22	16	6
51	(United States) Decotis	Honda											18	18																			6
52	(Italy) Moroni	Yamaha	22	16	32	21	37	28	35	31	36	28			32	36	30	35			29	32	29	31	36	32			28	29	32	31	5
53	(Brazil) Amaral	Suzuki																									18	19					5
54	(Italy) Battig	Honda	23	29	20	22	23	25	31	24	24	33			DSQ	25							19	26	30	25			23	21	24	19	5
55	(Netherlands) van den Bogaert	KTM					31	26															20	32					19	19			5
56	(Sweden) Noren	Honda																			22	17											4
57	(United States) Rossi	Kawasaki											27	17																			4
58	(Netherlands) Kouwenberg	Suzuki					27	37			34	36			34	28	28	27			23	34	18	34	27	27			33	36	30	35	3
59	(Sweden) Aspegren	KTM																			31	18											3
60	(Norway) Nyegaard	Honda																			36	19											2
60	(Norway) Nyegaard	Yamaha																					33	27	24	21							2
61	(United Kingdom) Allingham	Yamaha	27	28	21	19	34	27																									2
62	(Slovenia) Gercar	Honda					28	29	30	26	29	24			22	23	19	24											26	22	28	34	2
63	(Latvia) A. Justs	Honda	30	30	25	23	32	22	25	28	26	19			36	31			28	26	27	29											2
64	(Germany) Ullrich	Kawasaki									31	25					22	23							26	20							1
65	(United States) D. Tedder	Kawasaki											22	20																			1
66	(Italy) Bertuzzo	KTM																													23	20	1
67	(Netherlands) Meurs	KTM																											25	20			1
	(Sweden) Eriksson	KTM					36	DNS															25	24	22	28			32	25	25	21	0
	(France) Lefrançois	Honda													21	22																	0
	(United States) M. Tedder	Kawasaki											21	23																			0
	(United States) Minor	Honda											23	21																			0
	(Latvia) R. Justs	Husqvarna																	23	21													0
	(Uruguay) Cabrera	KTM																									21	23					0
	(Denmark) Olsen	Suzuki																					21	25									0
	(Netherlands) van Herpen	Honda																											21	27			0
	(Belgium) C. Lieber	Suzuki																							33	DNS					27	22	0
	(Italy) Maddii	Suzuki	24	23	26	25	24	24	32	34					23	24																	0
	(Zimbabwe) Mitchell	Suzuki															32	36	24	23	38	DNS	31	35	32	34			35	35	29	36	0
	(Switzerland) Auberson	KTM																							23	24							0
	(Italy) Del Segato	Suzuki																							25	26					37	23	0
	(Switzerland) Guillod	KTM																							29	23							0
	(Belgium) Poppe	KTM																											31	23			0
	(United Kingdom) Cottrell	Suzuki											24	24																			0
	(Denmark) Lynggaard	Kawasaki															31	26			24	25											0
	(Netherlands) Cuppen	Yamaha																											27	24			0
	(Germany) Heidecke	Kawasaki															24	28															0
	(Norway) Heibye	Honda																			37	30							24	33			0
	(United States) Thacker	Honda											25	25																			0
	(Netherlands) Brakke	Yamaha	28	26																													0
	(Norway) Granlien	Yamaha																			30	26											0
	(Spain) Cros	Kawasaki									33	26																					0
	(Belgium) Ghysels	KTM																					27	28									0
	(Portugal) Alberto	Suzuki	29	35					29	27																							0
	(Spain) Martínez	Yamaha									32	27																					0
	(France) Adam	KTM													27	37																	0
	(Germany) Oldekamp	KTM															27	DNS															0
	(United Kingdom) Banks-Browne	Honda			31	28																											0
	(Czech Republic) Harbich	Suzuki	36	DNS	28	33											36	DNS															0
	(France) Kappel	KTM													28	38																	0
	(United Kingdom) Hawkins	Honda													29	29																	0
	(Spain) Donate	Honda									35	29																					0
	(Hungary) Balazs	Suzuki																							31	30							0
	(Portugal) Fernandes	KTM							33	30																							0
	(Italy) Ciucci	KTM	31	33																													0
	(Sweden) Bengtsson	Honda																			32	DNS											0
	(Italy) Zeni	KTM																													34	33	0
	(United States) Huang	Honda											DNS	DNS																			0
	(Latvia) Teko	Yamaha																	DNS	DNS													0
	(Norway) Gultvedt	KTM																			DNS	DNS											0
	(Brazil) Ramos	Honda																									DNS	DNS					0
	(Uruguay) Rolando	Honda																									DNS	DNS					0
Pos	Rider	Bike	BUL (Bulgaria)		LOM (Lombardy)		NED (Netherlands)		POR (Portugal)		CAT (Catalonia)		USA (United States)		FRA (France)		GER (Germany)		LAT (Latvia)		SWE (Sweden)		LIM (Belgium)		CZE (Czech Republic)		BRA (Brazil)		BEN (Benelux)		ITA (Italy)		Pts

==== Manufacturers' Championship ====
Pos	Manufacturer	BUL (Bulgaria)		LOM (Lombardy)		NED (Netherlands)		POR (Portugal)		CAT (Catalonia)		USA (United States)		FRA (France)		GER (Germany)		LAT (Latvia)		SWE (Sweden)		LIM (Belgium)		CZE (Czech Republic)		BRA (Brazil)		BEN (Benelux)		ITA (Italy)		Pts
1	(Austria) KTM	1	1	1	1	1	1	1	1	3	1	1	1	1	1	1	2	1	1	2	4	2	1	2	1	2	2	2	2	2	6	701
2	(Japan) Suzuki	2	2	2	3	2	2	2	6	1	14	3	5	8	5	5	1	2	3	14	1	1	2	1	2	1	1	6	1	1	1	613
3	(Japan) Yamaha	8	7	5	5	6	8	5	3	4	3	4	2	3	4	4	3	6	4	5	3	6	4	6	3	4	4	1	3	4	3	533
4	(Japan) Kawasaki	3	4	3	10	4	3	11	4	2	7	2	4	4	14	2	4	4	2	1	2	9	8	4	4	6	3	5	13	3	2	525
5	(Japan) Honda	18	14	18	15	14	20	12	17	18	13	18	18	20	19	22	16	16	19	17	17	14	16	21	16	19	13	17	12	17	12	133
6	(Italy) TM					22	17	34	16	25	20					13	33			21	23	32	DNS	13	13			37	28	14	14	48
	(Sweden) Husqvarna																	23	21													0
Pos	Manufacturer	BUL (Bulgaria)		LOM (Lombardy)		NED (Netherlands)		POR (Portugal)		CAT (Catalonia)		USA (United States)		FRA (France)		GER (Germany)		LAT (Latvia)		SWE (Sweden)		LIM (Belgium)		CZE (Czech Republic)		BRA (Brazil)		BEN (Benelux)		ITA (Italy)		Pts

Colour	Result
Gold	Winner
Silver	Second place
Bronze	Third place
Green	Points classification
Blue	Non-points classification
Blue	Non-classified finish (NC)
Purple	Retired, not classified (Ret)
Red	Did not qualify (DNQ)
Red	Did not pre-qualify (DNPQ)
Black	Disqualified (DSQ)
White	Did not start (DNS)
White	Withdrew (WD)
White	Race cancelled (C)
Blank	Did not practice (DNP)
Blank	Did not arrive (DNA)
Blank	Excluded (EX)

=== MX3 ===
==== Riders' Championship ====
Pos	Rider	Bike	POR (Portugal)		FRA (France)		ARG (Argentina)		BUL (Bulgaria)		GRE (Greece)		CZE (Czech Republic)		SVK (Slovakia)		ESP (Spain)		SLO (Slovenia)		GER (Germany)		FIN (Finland)		SUI (Switzerland)		Pts
1	(Spain) Campano	Yamaha	1	1	2	4	2	1	4	1	2	2	2	1	1	2	1	18	1	1	2	1	2	1	5	3	526
2	(Italy) Salvini	Husqvarna	2	2	4	2	1	2	1	2	1	1	1	2	10	1	12	1	5	3	3	2	8	2	2	2	502
3	(Slovenia) Irt	Husqvarna	3	3	5	5	4	3	2	3	4	7	6	5	20	19	4	8	2	2	4	4	5	22	6	5	376
4	(Czech Republic) Žerava	Honda	8	5	6	8	6	6	5	4	3	8	4	4	3	6	6	4	4	6	5	11	14	20	9	10	348
5	(France) Potisek	Honda			10	7	5	4	3	5	6	3	10	21	2	3	2	2	6	18	1	3					290
6	(Czech Republic) Smola	Suzuki	11	17	16	14			8	7	8	5	14	11	12	11	3	6	9	8	6	6	16	7	8	12	249
7	(Argentina) Arco	Yamaha	7	10	11	13	3	5	6	6	5	4	18	23	11	12	5	5	11	11	16	23	17	16	15	11	247
8	(Czech Republic) Michalec	Honda	15	13	18	19	11	10	9	11	10	11	13	10	13	10	8	7	13	9	7	7	13	19			208
9	(Switzerland) Wicht	Honda			7	10					7	6	11	7	6	4	7	3							4	6	178
10	(Austria) Staufer	KTM													5	7			3	5	25	25			13	8	87
11	(Finland) Kovalainen	Yamaha	13	11	17	DNS													14	13	9	8	7	21			76
12	(Finland) Mäkinen	Honda	5	7	8	9																	11	11			75
13	(France) Martin	Husqvarna			3	3							7	6													69
14	(Czech Republic) Čepelák	Yamaha											5	8	4	5											63
15	(Slovenia) Kragelj	Yamaha							7	8									7	4							59
16	(Finland) Rouhiainen	Yamaha	14	12	19	21															11	13	12	10			56
17	(Finland) Nikkila	Yamaha	9	9	15	15																	10	17			51
18	(Switzerland) Bill	KTM																							1	1	50
19	(France) Pichon	KTM			1	1																					50
20	(Finland) Eriksson	KTM																					1	3			45
21	(Bulgaria) Kumanov	Honda							10	10	11	11															42
22	(Czech Republic) Michek	TM											3	3													40
23	(Chile) Noemi	Honda	17	14	23	22							23	18	17	15			20	DNS	20	18	22	18	18	16	40
24	(Italy) Beggi	TM											8	22	7	9											39
25	(Austria) Schmidinger	Honda																			12	12			12	9	39
26	(Belgium) Delince	KTM																							3	4	38
27	(Italy) Lombrici	Suzuki			12	12													10	12							38
28	(Switzerland) Valente	Honda			26	30			11	23	13	15	19	17											17	17	38
29	(Estonia) Laansoo	Honda																					4	4			36
30	(Portugal) Correia	Yamaha	4	4																							36
31	(Sweden) Lindström	KTM																					3	6			35
32	(Spain) Corrochano	Yamaha	16	15													10	10									33
33	(Latvia) Justs	Honda																					6	5			31
34	(Portugal) Venda	Kawasaki	6	6																							30
35	(Slovenia) Urbas	Kawasaki											17	12					15	19	14	20					29
36	(Argentina) Felipe	Kawasaki					7	7																			28
37	(Croatia) Šipek	Yamaha																	8	7							27
38	(Czech Republic) Masarik	Honda													8	8											26
39	(Argentina) Correa	Kawasaki					8	8																			26
40	(Slovakia) Kulhavý	KTM											15	14	9	20											26
41	(France) Billerey	Yamaha																							10	7	25
42	(Sweden) Petterson	KTM																					9	8			25
43	(Portugal) Basaula	Suzuki	10	8																							24
44	(Spain) Álvarez	Kawasaki															9	9									24
45	(Czech Republic) Zaremba	Honda											9	9													24
46	(Chile) Le. Quintanilla	Honda					9	9																			24
47	(Latvia) Apfelbaums	Honda	12	16	14	18																					24
48	(Germany) Schröter	KTM																			10	9					23
49	(Greece) Kouzis	Yamaha									9	10															23
50	(France) Botannelli	KTM			9	11																					22
51	(Italy) Tiveddu	TM											22	19	16	16			19	14							21
52	(Slovenia) Mulec	Suzuki																	12	10							20
53	(Spain) J. Rodríguez	Yamaha															11	11									20
54	(Chile) Lu. Quintanilla	Honda					10	13																			19
55	(Argentina) Villar	Honda					12	11																			19
56	(Switzerland) Auberson	KTM																							11	13	18
57	(Greece) Vagelakos	Yamaha									12	12															18
58	(Spain) Varga	Kawasaki															13	12									17
59	(Bulgaria) Yovchev	Honda							12	13																	17
60	(Germany) Heidecke	Kawasaki																			28	5					16
61	(France) Izoird	Suzuki			20	6																					16
62	(Romania) Raduta	KTM							14	12																	16
63	(Argentina) Freytes	Honda					14	12																			16
64	(France) Léonce	Suzuki											12	15													15
65	(Spain) Vieira	Suzuki															14	13									15
66	(Hungary) Borka	Kawasaki													14	13											15
67	(Bulgaria) Totev	Honda							13	14																	15
68	(Austria) Reisinger	Suzuki																							21	7	14
69	(Cyprus) Savvas	Yamaha									14	14															14
70	(Croatia) Božić	KTM											20	21					17	16	29	17					14
71	(Poland) Lonka	Honda																			8	29					13
72	(France) Viguier	Suzuki			13	16																					13
73	(Ukraine) Morozov	Kawasaki																							14	15	13
74	(Ukraine) O. Pashchynskyi	KTM																			15	14					13
75	(Spain) Ó. Rodríguez	Honda															15	14									13
76	(Slovakia) Szolga	Honda													15	14											13
77	(Chile) Cabrera	Suzuki					15	14																			13
78	(Estonia) Lethla	KTM																					21	9			12
79	(Bulgaria) Petrov	Honda							22	9																	12
80	(Finland) Matikainen	Honda																					18	12			12
81	(France) Guidolin	Yamaha																							16	14	12
82	(Bulgaria) Gochev	Honda							15	15																	12
83	(Germany) Jache	Husqvarna																			23	10					11
84	(Slovenia) Slavec	Honda																	16	15							11
85	(Argentina) Castillo	Honda					16	15																			11
86	(Germany) Wolff	Honda																			17	15					10
87	(Spain) J. García	Yamaha															16	16									10
88	(Finland) Aro	KTM																					20	13			9
89	(Spain) Jorge	Kawasaki															18	15									9
90	(Chile) V. Israel	Honda					21	13																			8
91	(Greece) Fotopoulos	KTM									23	13															8
92	(Czech Republic) Stránský	KTM											24	13													8
93	(Ukraine) M. Pashchynskyi	KTM																			13	26					8
94	(Finland) Ma. Jumppanen	Honda																					19	15			8
95	(Bulgaria) Tomanov	Yamaha							18	16																	8
96	(Argentina) Petrocelli	Honda					18	16																			8
97	(Spain) Hernández	Yamaha															17	17									8
98	(Bulgaria) Georgiev	Yamaha							17	17																	8
99	(Argentina) Belaustegui	Kawasaki					17	17																			8
100	(Austria) Hauer	KTM													18	17					24	28			22	20	8
101	(Finland) Silvennoinen	Kawasaki																					23	14			7
102	(Italy) Buso	KTM			25	24													18	17	26	27					7
103	(Finland) Mi. Jumppanen	Honda																					15	23			6
104	(Greece) Skivalos	Honda									15	DNS															6
105	(Czech Republic) Vaněček	TM											20	16													6
106	(Bulgaria) Shevkiev	Suzuki							16	21																	5
107	(Greece) Liriou	Suzuki									16	22															5
108	(Czech Republic) Vaněček	Kawasaki											16	24													5
109	(Germany) Mock	Honda																			27	16					5
110	(Greece) Tzioras	Kawasaki									DNS	16															5
111	(Austria) Kraus	KTM													19	18					22	22			21	22	5
112	(Germany) E. Grybowski	Suzuki																			18	19					5
113	(Cyprus) Sokratous	KTM									19	18															5
114	(Argentina) E. García	Honda					19	18																			5
115	(Cyprus) Siderenios	Yamaha									21	17															4
116	(Switzerland) Burn	Yamaha									21	17															4
117	(Greece) Papavasiliou	KTM									17	21															4
118	(Spain) Arana	Yamaha																			21	24			20	18	4
119	(Greece) Andreou	KTM									18	20															4
120	(Belgium) Begon	Yamaha																							19	19	4
121	(Bulgaria) Bekirov	Kawasaki							23	18																	3
122	(Bulgaria) Marinov	Suzuki							20	19																	3
123	(Bulgaria) Rashkov	Honda							19	20																	3
124	(Chile) J. Israel	Honda					20	19																			3
125	(Germany) P. Grybowski	Suzuki																			19	21					2
126	(Greece) Zervos	Kawasaki									22	19															2
127	(France) Nogarede	Honda			22	20																					1
128	(Argentina) Urcera	Yamaha					22	20																			1
129	(Greece) Doumanis	Kawasaki									20	23															1
	(Bulgaria) Ivanov	Honda							21	22																	0
	(Argentina) Yañez	Honda					21	22																			0
	(Chile) Quintanilla Vásquez	Honda					23	23																			0
	(France) Rui	Suzuki			31	23																					0
	(Chile) B. Israel	Honda					24	24																			0
	(France) Touzla	KTM			24	25																					0
	(Bulgaria) Kokarov	KTM							24	DNS																	0
	(Argentina) Galván	Honda					25	25																			0
	(Argentina) Mezher	Suzuki					26	26																			0
	(France) Gautronet	Yamaha			27	26																					0
	(France) Maure	Suzuki			28	27																					0
	(France) Schneider	Suzuki			30	28																					0
	(France) Courneil	Yamaha			29	31																					0
	(France) Tarallo	Kawasaki			32	29																					0
	(Poland) Mank	Honda																			30	DNS					0
	(France) Sandouly	Yamaha			33	DNS																					0
Pos	Rider	Bike	POR (Portugal)		FRA (France)		ARG (Argentina)		BUL (Bulgaria)		GRE (Greece)		CZE (Czech Republic)		SVK (Slovakia)		ESP (Spain)		SLO (Slovenia)		GER (Germany)		FIN (Finland)		SUI (Switzerland)		Pts

Colour	Result
Gold	Winner
Silver	Second place
Bronze	Third place
Green	Points classification
Blue	Non-points classification
Blue	Non-classified finish (NC)
Purple	Retired, not classified (Ret)
Red	Did not qualify (DNQ)
Red	Did not pre-qualify (DNPQ)
Black	Disqualified (DSQ)
White	Did not start (DNS)
White	Withdrew (WD)
White	Race cancelled (C)
Blank	Did not practice (DNP)
Blank	Did not arrive (DNA)
Blank	Excluded (EX)

==== Manufacturers' Championship ====
Pos	Manufacturer	POR (Portugal)		FRA (France)		ARG (Argentina)		BUL (Bulgaria)		GRE (Greece)		CZE (Czech Republic)		SVK (Slovakia)		ESP (Spain)		SLO (Slovenia)		GER (Germany)		FIN (Finland)		SUI (Switzerland)		Pts
1	(Japan) Yamaha	1	1	2	4	2	1	4	1	2	2	2	1	1	2	1	5	1	1	2	1	2	1	5	3	539
2	(Sweden) Husqvarna	2	2	3	2	1	2	1	2	1	1	1	2	10	1	4	1	2	2	3	2	5	2	2	2	524
3	(Japan) Honda	5	5	1	1	5	4	3	4	3	3	4	4	2	3	2	2	4	6	1	3	4	4	4	6	463
4	(Japan) Suzuki	10	8	12	6	15	14	8	7	8	5	12	11	12	11	3	6	9	8	6	6	16	7	7	12	287
5	(Austria) KTM			9	11			14	12	17	13	15	13	5	7			3	5	10	9	1	3	1	1	248
6	(Japan) Kawasaki	6	6	30	28	7	7	23	18	20	16	16	12	14	13	9	9	15	19	14	5	23	14	14	15	171
7	(Italy) TM											3	3	7	9			19	14							75
Pos	Manufacturer	POR (Portugal)		FRA (France)		ARG (Argentina)		BUL (Bulgaria)		GRE (Greece)		CZE (Czech Republic)		SVK (Slovakia)		ESP (Spain)		SLO (Slovenia)		GER (Germany)		FIN (Finland)		SUI (Switzerland)		Pts

Colour	Result
Gold	Winner
Silver	Second place
Bronze	Third place
Green	Points classification
Blue	Non-points classification
Blue	Non-classified finish (NC)
Purple	Retired, not classified (Ret)
Red	Did not qualify (DNQ)
Red	Did not pre-qualify (DNPQ)
Black	Disqualified (DSQ)
White	Did not start (DNS)
White	Withdrew (WD)
White	Race cancelled (C)
Blank	Did not practice (DNP)
Blank	Did not arrive (DNA)
Blank	Excluded (EX)

== Participants ==
- Riders with red background numbers are defending champions. All riders were announced with numbers on February 5, 2010.

=== MX1 participants ===
Team	Constructor	No	Rider
Red Bull KTM Factory Racing	KTM	2	(Germany) Maximilian Nagl
Red Bull KTM Factory Racing	KTM	22	(Portugal) Rui Goncalves
Red Bull KTM Factory Racing	KTM	222	(Italy) Antonio Cairoli
B.O Team	KTM	4	(Belgium) Kevin Strijbos
Aprilia Racing	Aprilia	6	(New Zealand) Josh Coppins
Aprilia Racing	Aprilia	15	(Switzerland) Julien Bill
Aprilia Racing	Aprilia	32	(Belgium) Manuel Priem
Kawasaki Racing Team	Kawasaki	7	(Spain) Jonathan Barragan
Kawasaki Racing Team	Kawasaki	90	(France) Sébastien Pourcel
Kawasaki Racing Team	Kawasaki	121	(France) Xavier Boog
CAS	Honda	8	(South Africa) Gareth Swanepoel
CAS	Honda	777	(Russia) Evgeny Bobryshev
Yamaha Monster Energy Ricci	Yamaha	9	(Belgium) Ken De Dycker
TM Racing Factory Team	TM	10	(France) Anthony Boissiere
TM Racing Factory Team	TM	111	(Estonia) Aigar Leok
TM Racing Factory Team	TM	131	(Czech Republic) Martin Michek
Team Teka Suzuki World MX1	Suzuki	11	(Belgium) Steve Ramon
Team Teka Suzuki World MX1	Suzuki	25	(Belgium) Clément Desalle
3C Racing	Yamaha	13	(Italy) Manuel Monni
3C Racing	Yamaha	36	(Italy) Matteo Bonini
Beursfoon Suzuki MX Team	Suzuki	14	(Netherlands) Marc de Reuver
Yamaha Van Beers Racing	Yamaha	17	(Sweden) Tom Söderström
Yamaha Monster Energy Motocross Team	Yamaha	19	(Italy) David Philippaerts
Bud Racing/Rockstar/Kawasaki	Kawasaki	20	(France) Gregory Aranda
Buildbase CCM Racing	CCM	24	(United Kingdom) Tom Church
Buildbase CCM Racing	CCM	71	(United Kingdom) Stephen Sword
Latvia Elksni Honda	Honda	27	(Latvia) Filips Kempelis
Latvia Elksni Honda	Honda	74	(Latvia) Ivo Steinbergs
LS Honda	Honda	39	(Italy) Davide Guarneri
LS Honda	Honda	40	(Estonia) Tanel Leok
Delta Racing Team	Suzuki	45	(France) Loic Leonce
Delta Racing Team	Suzuki	49	(Austria) Gunther Schmidinger
Hillinger KTM MX-Racing Team	KTM	52	(Austria) Matthias Walkner
Sturm Racing Team	Kawasaki	75	(Belgium) Kevin Wouts
Sturm Racing Team	Kawasaki	77	(South Africa) Shannon Terreblanche
Honda Martin Racing	Honda	101	(New Zealand) Ben Townley
Honda Martin Racing	Honda	702	(United States) Jimmy Albertson
KTM Sarholz Racing Team	KTM	120	(France) Cedric Soubeyras
KTM HDI MX Team	KTM	383	(France) Mathias Bellino

Key
Regular Rider
Wildcard Rider
Replacement Rider

=== MX2 participants ===
Team	Constructor	No	Rider
Red Bull KTM Factory Racing	KTM	1	(France) Marvin Musquin
Red Bull KTM Factory Racing	KTM	11	(United Kingdom) Shaun Simpson
Red Bull KTM Factory Racing	KTM	111	(Netherlands) Jeffrey Herlings
KTM Sarholz Racing Team	KTM	19	(Czech Republic) Petr Smitka
Yamaha Monster Energy Motocross Team	Yamaha	21	(France) Gautier Paulin
Teka Suzuki Europe World MX 2	Suzuki	23	(Switzerland) Arnaud Tonus
Teka Suzuki Europe World MX 2	Suzuki	94	(Germany) Ken Roczen
Nestaan Team	Honda	24	(Netherlands) Herjan Brakke
Nestaan Team	Honda	25	(Netherlands) Glenn Coldenhoff
AXO KTM Silver Action	KTM	27	(Germany) Marcus Schiffer
AXO KTM Silver Action	KTM	62	(Slovenia) Klemen Gercar
Team MotoVision-SUSO-Suzuki	Suzuki	29	(Latvia) Matiss Karro
Yamaha Van Beers Racing	Yamaha	30	(Netherlands) Ceriel Klein Kromhof
JM Racing Team KTM	KTM	34	(Belgium) Joel Roelants
JM Racing Team KTM	KTM	52	(France) Axel Alletru
JM Racing Team KTM	KTM	335	(Belgium) Dennis Verbruggen
SRS Racing	Honda	35	(Denmark) Nikolaj Larsen
SRS Racing	Honda	152	(Bulgaria) Petar Petrov
KTM HDI MX Team	KTM	37	(France) Valentin Teillet
HM Plant Red Bull KTM UK	KTM	45	(United Kingdom) Jake Nicholls
HM Plant Red Bull KTM UK	KTM	555	(United Kingdom) Graeme Irwin
TM Racing Factory Team	TM	64	(France) Khounsith Vongsana
Beursfoon Suzuki MX Team	Suzuki	71	(Spain) José Butrón
Shineray MX Team China	Honda	75	(Belgium) Nick Triest
Yamaha Monster Energy Ricci	Yamaha	77	(Italy) Alessandro Lupino
Yamaha Monster Energy Ricci	Yamaha	202	(France) Loic Larrieu
Kawasaki Team CLS	Kawasaki	89	(Belgium) Jeremy van Horebeek
Kawasaki Team CLS	Kawasaki	183	(France) Steven Frossard
3C Racing	Yamaha	90	(Italy) Rudi Moroni
Honda Martin Racing	Honda	92	(Italy) Alessandro Battig
Latvia Elksni Honda	Honda	95	(Latvia) Augusts Justs
Bike-it Cosworth Yamaha UK	Yamaha	119	(United Kingdom) Mel Pocock
Bike-it Cosworth Yamaha UK	Yamaha	123	(United Kingdom) Edward Allingham
Bike-it Cosworth Yamaha UK	Yamaha	338	(United States) Zach Osborne
Bud Racing/Rockstar/Kawasaki	Kawasaki	131	(France) Nicolas Aubin
Yamaha Gariboldi Monster Energy	Yamaha	151	(Finland) Harri Kullas
Yamaha Gariboldi Monster Energy	Yamaha	430	(France) Christophe Charlier
Delta Suzuki	Suzuki	153	(Italy) Marco Maddii
ESTA - MX Team	Suzuki	310	(Russia) Aleksandr Tonkov
Rossi Racing Team	Suzuki	414	(Italy) Deny Philippaerts

Key
Regular Rider
Wildcard Rider
Replacement Rider

=== MX3 participants ===
No	Rider	Constructor	Rounds
5	(France) Christophe Martin	Husqvarna	2, 6
7	(Slovenia) Saso Kragelj	Yamaha	4, 9
9	(Chile) Jeremias Israel	Honda	3
10	(France) Mickaël Pichon	Honda	2
11	(Czech Republic) Martin Zerava	Honda	1–12
14	(Switzerland) Kevin Auberson	KTM	12
15	(Greece) Stamatis Liriou	Suzuki	5
17	(Czech Republic) Jan Zaremba	Honda	6
18	(Spain) Oscar Rodriguez	Honda	8
22	(Switzerland) Gregory Wicht	Honda	2, 5–8, 12
23	(Italy) Alex Salvini	Husqvarna	1–12
28	(Croatia) Nenad Sipek	Yamaha	9
29	(Finland) Jussi Nikkila	Yamaha	1–2, 11
30	(Finland) Tommi Makinen	Honda	1–2, 11
31	(Spain) Javier Corrochano	Yamaha	1, 8
32	(France) Milko Potisek	Honda	2–10
33	(Croatia) Danijel Bozic	KTM	6, 9–10
36	(France) Paul Gautronet	Yamaha	2
38	(Finland) Riku Rouhiainen	Yamaha	1–2, 10–11
39	(France) Pierre Rui	Suzuki	2
40	(Argentina) Victor Dario Arco	Yamaha	1–12
43	(Bulgaria) Bozhidar Tomanov	Yamaha	4
44	(Spain) Raul Alvarez	Kawasaki	8
45	(France) Clément Maure	Suzuki	2
46	(Czech Republic) Jiri Cepelak	Yamaha	6–7
48	(Austria) Andreas Schmidinger	Honda	10, 12
49	(Argentina) José Manuel Urcera	Yamaha	3
50	(Argentina) Patricio Petrocelli	Honda	3
51	(Argentina) Juan Belaustegui	Kawasaki	3
52	(Argentina) Augusto Freytes	Honda	3
53	(Argentina) José Gerardo Felipe	Kawasaki	3
54	(Argentina) Demian Villar	Honda	3
55	(France) Bertrand Courneil	Yamaha	2
56	(Ukraine) Mykola Pashchynskyi	KTM	10
57	(France) Florian Nogarede	Honda	2
58	(France) Olivier Schneider	Kawasaki	2
60	(Argentina) Enrique Garcia	Honda	3
61	(Argentina) Julio Mezher	Suzuki	3
62	(Argentina) Luis Correa	Kawasaki	3
63	(Argentina) Ivan Galvan	Honda	3
65	(Romania) Adrian Raduta	KTM	4
67	(Czech Republic) Petr Michalec	Honda	1–11
68	(Chile) Luciano Quintanilla	Honda	3
69	(Chile) Leonardo Quintanilla	Honda	3
70	(Chile) Pablo Quintanilla Vasquez	Honda	3
71	(Chile) Patricio Cabrera	Suzuki	3
74	(Czech Republic) Martin Vanecek	TM	6
75	(France) Frédéric Sandouly	Yamaha	2
77	(Argentina) Matias Castillo	Honda	3
80	(Argentina) Rodrigo Sanduay	Husqvarna	3

No	Rider	Constructor	Rounds
81	(Greece) Dimitris Doumanis	Kawasaki	5
82	(Argentina) Gaston Yanez	Honda	3
85	(Spain) Jonathan Rodriguez	Yamaha	8
86	(Ukraine) Oleksandr Pashchynskyi	KTM	10
87	(Slovakia) Tomas Simko	KTM	6–7
88	(Chile) Alejandro Noemi	Honda	1–2, 6–7, 9–12
89	(Bulgaria) Ismet Bekirov	Kawasaki	4
90	(Chile) Benjamin Israel	Honda	3
92	(Germany) Angus Heidecke	Kawasaki	10
93	(Estonia) Lauri Lehtla	KTM	6, 11
94	(Slovakia) Richard Szolga	Honda	7
95	(Czech Republic) Jan Brabec	Kawasaki	6
97	(Cyprus) Sokratis Sokratous	KTM	5
98	(Cyprus) George Siderenios	Yamaha	5
99	(Italy) Roberto Lombrici	Suzuki	2, 9
102	(Cyprus) Savva Savvas	Yamaha	5
106	(Spain) Aitor Vieira	Suzuki	8
107	(Germany) Dennis Schröter	KTM	10
108	(Poland) Arek Mank	Honda	10
110	(Poland) Lukasz Lonka	Honda	10
111	(Bulgaria) Stoyan Rashkov	Honda	4
112	(Germany) Stephan Mock	Honda	10
115	(Spain) Carlos Campano Jiménez	Yamaha	1–12
116	(Germany) Eric Grybowski	Suzuki	10
118	(Spain) Jorge Garcia	Yamaha	8
119	(Germany) Toni Wolff	Honda	10
122	(Italy) Antonio Tiveddu	TM	6–7, 9
123	(Portugal) Henrique Venda	Kawasaki	1
124	(Spain) Teofilo Hernandez	Yamaha	8
125	(Finland) Samuli Aro	KTM	11
126	(Germany) Paul Grybowski	Suzuki	10
127	(Finland) Toni Eriksson	KTM	11
128	(Greece) Nektarios Papavasiliou	KTM	5
129	(Spain) Txomin Arana	Yamaha	10, 12
130	(Finland) Marko Jumppanen	Honda	11
131	(Czech Republic) Martin Michek	TM	6
133	(Latvia) Niks Apfelbaums	Honda	1–2
134	(Finland) Toni Matikainen	Honda	11
135	(Austria) Stefan Hauer	KTM	7, 10, 12
136	(Finland) Mikko Jumppanen	Honda	11
137	(Ukraine) Roman Morozov	Kawasaki	12
138	(France) Romain Billerey	Yamaha	12
139	(France) Jérôme Viguier	Suzuki	2
140	(Czech Republic) Petr Masarik	Honda	7
142	(Finland) Petteri Silvennoinen	Kawasaki	11
144	(Sweden) Kim Lindstrom	KTM	11
145	(France) Loic Leonce	Suzuki	6
146	(Greece) Kostas Tzioras	Kawasaki	5
148	(Slovenia) Erik Slavec	Honda	9

No	Rider	Constructor	Rounds
151	(Switzerland) Julien Bill	KTM	12
152	(Bulgaria) Petar Petrov	Honda	4
155	(Italy) Christian Beggi	TM	6–7
162	(Austria) Michael Staufer	KTM	7, 9–10, 12
164	(Greece) Teo Zervos	Kawasaki	5
170	(Spain) David Varga	Kawasaki	8
171	(Finland) Marko Kovalainen	Yamaha	1–2, 9–11
172	(Switzerland) Christopher Valente	Honda	2, 4–6, 12
181	(Greece) Nikos Andreou	KTM	5
186	(France) Guillaume Botannelli	KTM	2
187	(Estonia) Heido Havam	KTM	11
195	(Latvia) Augusts Justs	Honda	11
199	(Bulgaria) Nikolay Yovchev	Honda	4
201	(Czech Republic) František Smola	Suzuki	1–2, 4–12
211	(Bulgaria) Georgi Gochev	Honda	4
214	(Austria) Oswald Reisinger	Suzuki	12
217	(Greece) Dimitris Vagelakos	Yamaha	5
220	(Belgium) Jeremy Delince	KTM	12
224	(Slovenia) Theo Urbas	Kawasaki	6, 9–10
244	(United Kingdom) Peter Redford	Honda	8
258	(Bulgaria) Shevki Shevkiev	Suzuki	4
259	(Italy) Mattia Buso	KTM	2, 9–10
266	(Hungary) Janos Borka	Kawasaki	7
272	(Germany) Enrico Jache	Husqvarna	10
277	(Sweden) Anders Petterson	KTM	11
289	(Slovenia) Matevz Irt	Husqvarna	1–12
311	(Portugal) Luis Correia	Yamaha	1
317	(Bulgaria) Todor Totev	Honda	4
331	(Greece) Manolis Skivalos	Honda	5
333	(Bulgaria) Gancho Georgiev	Yamaha	4
338	(Greece) Panagiotis Kouzis	Yamaha	5
391	(Bulgaria) Krum Kokarov	KTM	4
481	(Spain) Renedo Jorge	Kawasaki	8
501	(Bulgaria) Ivailo Ivanov	Honda	4
507	(Slovenia) Toni Mulec	Suzuki	9
517	(Bulgaria) Toni Marinov	Suzuki	4
555	(Bulgaria) Nikolay Kumanov	Honda	4–5
557	(Belgium) Loic Begon	Yamaha	12
560	(France) Kevin Tarallo	Kawasaki	2
713	(France) Anthony Guidolin	Yamaha	12
747	(Portugal) Hugo Basaula	Suzuki	1
787	(Czech Republic) Vit Stransky	KTM	6
798	(France) Xavier Toulza	KTM	2
871	(France) Fabien Izoird	Suzuki	2
885	(Austria) David Kraus	KTM	7, 10, 12
917	(Greece) Christos Fotopoulos	KTM	5
942	(Estonia) Juss Laansoo	Honda	11
987	(Switzerland) Jonathan Burn	Yamaha	2
999	(Chile) Vicente Israel	Honda	3
