= Marvin Musquin =

French motorcycle racer (born 1989)

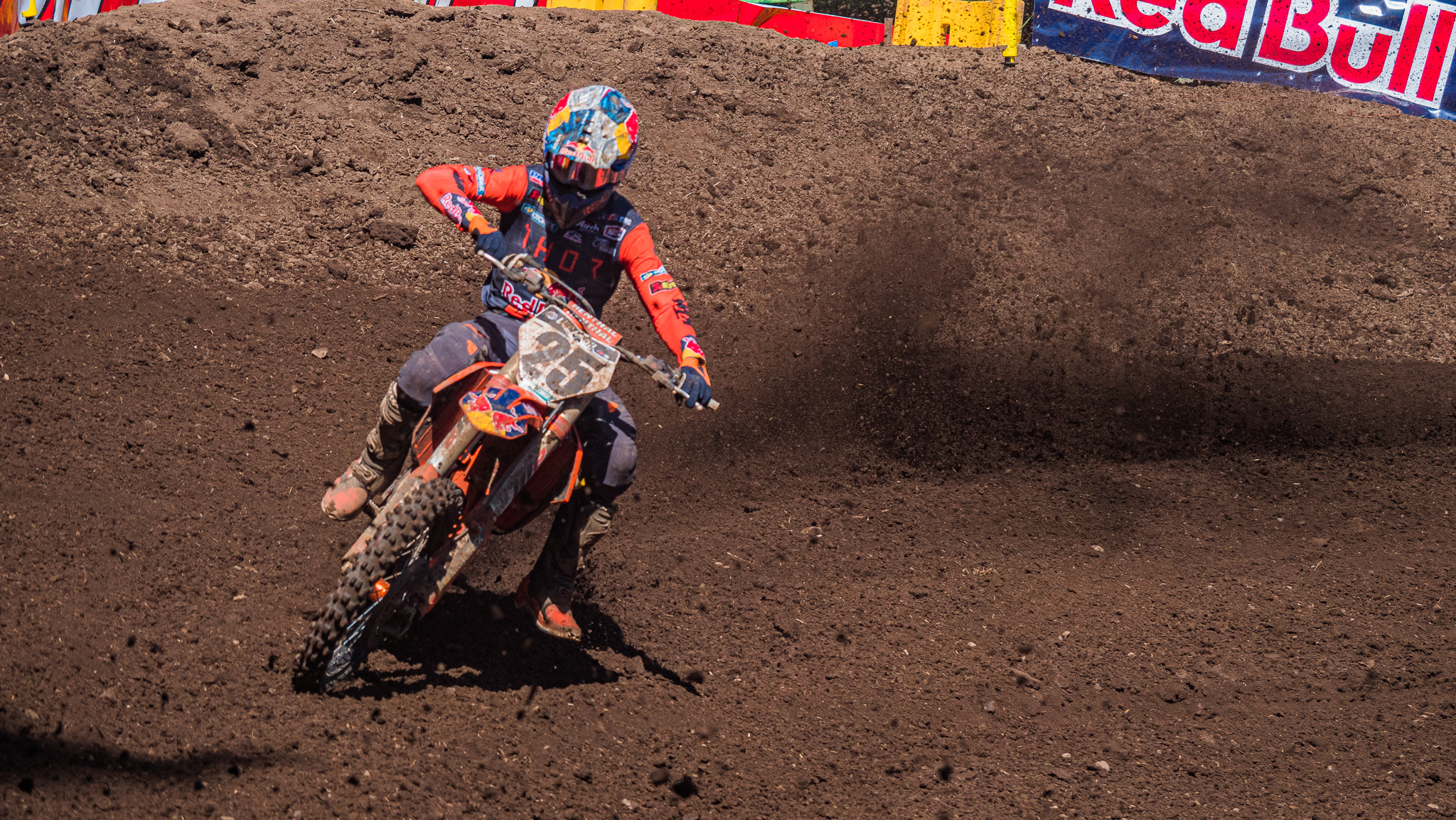
- Musquin in 2021
- Nationality: French
- Born: 30 December 1989 (age 36) La Réole, France

Motocross career
- Years active: 2004–2023
- Teams: •Red Bull KTM Factory Racing (2009-2023)
- Championships: •2004 EMX 85cc; •2009 MX2; •2010 MX2; •2015 AMA Supercross 250cc East
- Wins: •MX2: 14; •AMA 450cc Supercross: 10; •AMA 450cc Motocross: 9; •AMA 250cc Supercross: 11; •AMA 250cc Motocross: 8
- GP debut: 2005, GP of Germany, Teutschenthal, MX1
- First GP win: 2009, GP of Bulgaria, MX2

Marvin Musquin (born 30 December 1989 in La Réole, France) is a French former professional motocross and supercross racer. He competed in the Motocross World Championships from 2004 to 2010 and the AMA Motocross Championships from 2011 to 2023. He is a two-time MX2 World Champion & the 2015 250cc AMA Supercross East Champion.

== Motocross career ==
=== 2004-2008 ===
In 2004, Musquin won the European Motocross Championship in the 85cc class. He followed this by winning the third place in 2006 125cc Junior World Championship. He competed on a privateer Honda in the 2008 F.I.M. MX2-GP world championship, finishing in 14th place.

=== 2009-2010 ===
Musquin won the 2009 F.I.M. MX2-GP World Championship and, successfully defended his title in 2010 while riding for the KTM factory racing team managed by former world champion Stefan Everts.

=== 2011-2015 ===
Since 2011, Musquin has competed in the 250cc class of the AMA Motocross Championship, finishing the 2013 season in third place overall. In 2014, he won the first Red Bull Straight Rhythm in the 250cc class. In 2015, he won the East Supercross 250MX class Championship. Musquin was also a member of the victorious French 2015 Motocross des Nations team that included Gautier Paulin and Romain Febvre.

=== 2016-2018 ===
In 2016, Musquin finished third behind Ken Roczen and Eli Tomac in the AMA pro Motocross championship. In 2017, he finished second 17 points behind Eli Tomac in the Motocross Championship. He finished second in the standings and nine points behind Jason Anderson in the 2018 Monster Energy AMA 450 Supercross Championship.

Musquin previously trained under the stewardship of professional motocross trainer Aldon Baker.

== AMA Supercross/Motocross/MX2 Results ==
Year	Rnd 1	Rnd 2	Rnd 3	Rnd 4	Rnd 5	Rnd 6	Rnd 7	Rnd 8	Rnd 9	Rnd 10	Rnd 11	Rnd 12	Rnd 13	Rnd 14	Rnd 15	Rnd 16	Rnd 17	Average Finish	Podium Percent	Place
2009 MX2	3	1	3	7	3	11	1	1	3	2	OUT	1	9	1	1	-	-	3.35	79%	1st
2010 MX2	1	1	5	1	1	1	1	1	4	5	3	1	2	2	10	-	-	2.60	73%	1st
2011 250 MX	5	40	OUT	OUT	OUT	OUT	OUT	14	6	6	3	3	-	-	-	-	-	11.00	29%	13th
~2012 250 SX-W	4	2	19	2	3	16	-	-	-	-	-	-	-	-	2	5	5	6.44	44%	3rd
2012 250 MX	9	6	5	5	5	4	7	4	4	1	5	3	-	-	-	-	-	4.83	17%	5th
2013 250 SX-E	-	-	-	-	-	-	6	3	4	1	1	1	3	1	-	-	3	2.56	78%	2nd
2013 250 MX	4	4	1	1	3	8	4	3	2	8	7	7	-	-	-	-	-	4.33	42%	3rd
2014 250 MX	8	7	5	7	5	2	10	2	1	3	1	5	-	-	-	-	-	4.67	42%	4th
2015 250 SX-E	-	-	-	-	-	-	1	2	1	1	1	2	1	-	-	1	1	1.22	100%	1st
2015 250 MX	2	1	7	2	1	1	6	4	2	2	2	10	-	-	-	-	-	3.33	67%	2nd
2016 450 SX	14	9	9	3	9	7	6	2	3	2	2	17	OUT	OUT	10	7	21	8.06	33%	7th
2016 450 MX	8	9	14	3	5	5	4	2	3	2	3	4	-	-	-	-	-	5.17	42%	3rd
2017 450 SX	3	3	2	9	9	1	2	5	13	OUT	2	2	3	1	4	2	22	5.18	63%	3rd
2017 450 MX	2	1	2	11	14	3	12	1	1	1	2	2	-	-	-	-	-	4.33	75%	2nd
2018 450 SX	1	OUT	13	5	4	2	2	2	2	5	3	1	3	3	1	1	2	3.12	75%	2nd
2018 450 MX	2	2	4	2	3	1	1	3	3	1	3	3	-	-	-	-	-	2.33	92%	2nd
2019 450 SX	8	5	2	2	2	3	3	6	3	3	1	1	2	6	3	5	2	3.41	71%	3rd
2019 450 MX	6	2	5	6	1	1	3	4	3	2	3	9	-	-	-	-	-	3.75	58%	3rd
2020 450 SX	OUT	OUT	OUT	OUT	OUT	OUT	OUT	OUT	OUT	OUT	OUT	OUT	OUT	OUT	OUT	OUT	OUT	-	-	-
2020 450 MX	4	3	2	4	4	6	2	6	5	-	-	-	-	-	-	-	-	4.00	33%	4th
2021 450 SX	3	6	13	10	11	3	7	2	DNF	OUT	OUT	DNF	7	7	9	1	2	6.23	38%	9th
2021 450 MX	7	9	8	14	8	7	4	3	7	OUT	OUT	OUT	-	-	-	-	-	7.44	11%	7th
2022 450 SX	4	8	10	6	7	5	3	14	6	4	3	3	1	10	3	3	5	5.58	35%	4th

== Personal life ==
Musquin married his long-time girlfriend, Mathilde, on 13 September 2019. They have one child together, a daughter born in December 2022.
