= Carlos Campano =

Spanish motorcycle racer

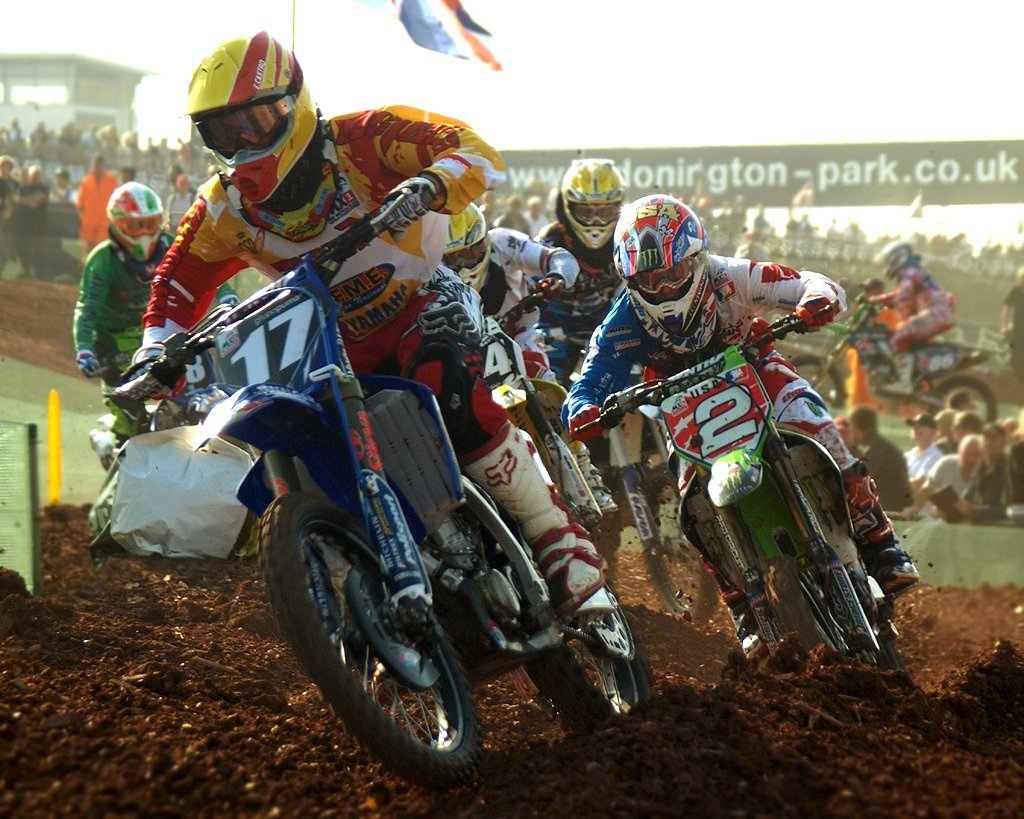
- Campano (#17) in 2008.
- Nationality: Spanish
- Born: Carlos Campano Jiménez; 15 September 1985 (age 40) Dos Hermanas, Spain

Motocross career
- Years active: 2003 - 2014
- Teams: Yamaha (2003-2004); KTM (2005-2006); Yamaha (2007-2014)
- Championships: MX3 - 2010
- Wins: 7

Carlos Campano Jiménez (born 15 September 1985) is a former Spanish professional motocross rider, and world champion in MX3 class in 2010.
