= Austin Howell =

American climber (1987–2019)

Austin Howell (September 14, 1987 – June 30, 2019) was an American climber and noted free soloist. Beyond his many climbing achievements, he was known for his social media following and public struggles with mental health problems. He died in a fall from Shortoff Mountain in Burke County, North Carolina, in 2019.
