= Lierop =

- Village
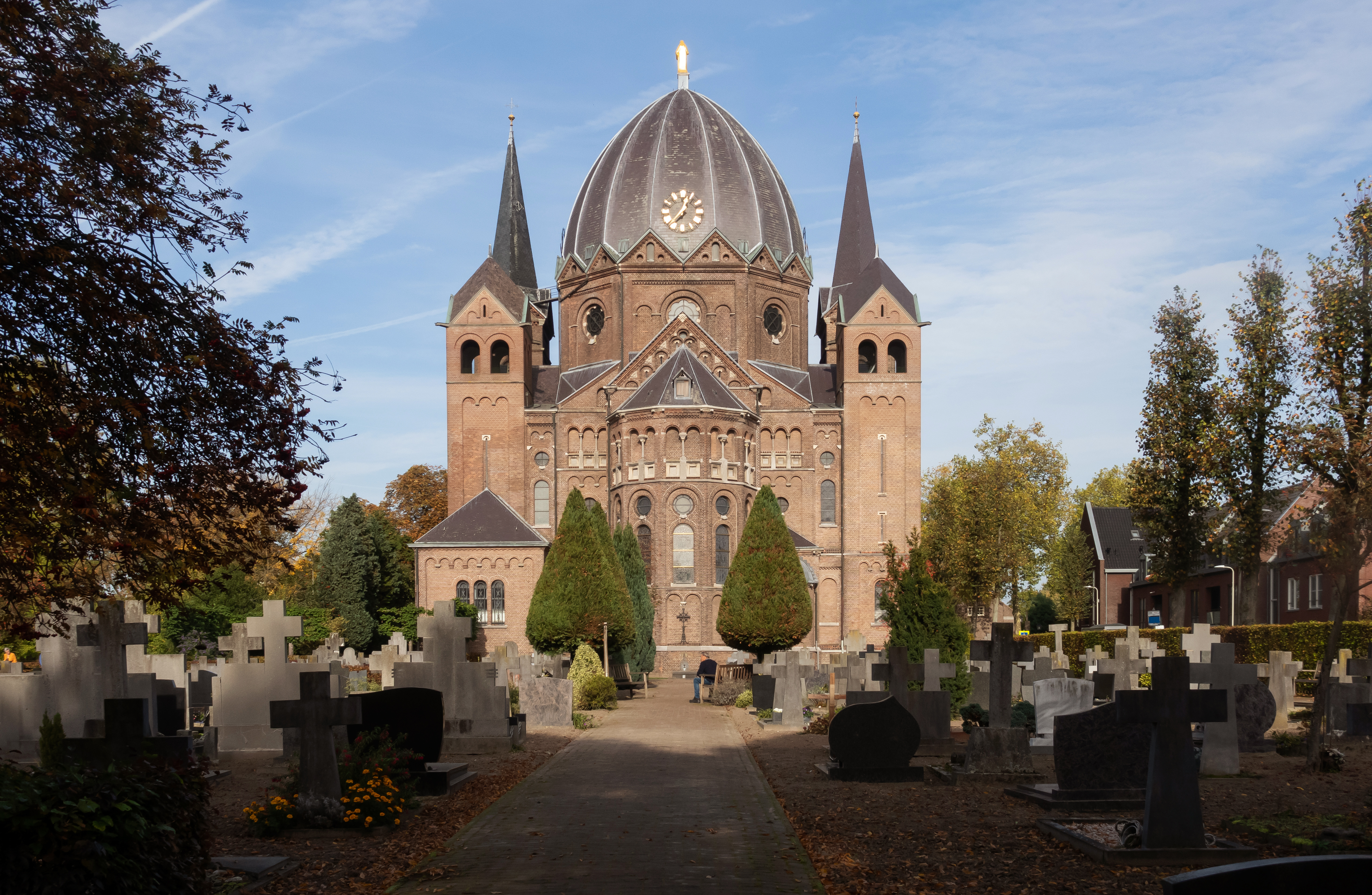
- Home Name of Jesus Church

- Location in the province of North Brabant in the Netherlands Lierop (Netherlands)
- Coordinates: 51°25′4″N 5°40′55″E
- Country: Netherlands
- Province: North Brabant
- Municipality: Someren

Area
  - Total: 1.52 km^{2} (0.59 sq mi)
- Elevation: 24 m (79 ft)

Population (2021)
  - Total: 1,425
  - Density: 937/km^{2} (2,430/sq mi)
- Time zone: UTC+1 (CET)
  - Summer (DST): UTC+2 (CEST)
- Postal code: 5715
- Dialing code: 0492

Lierop is a village in the Dutch province of North Brabant. It is located in the municipality of Someren, about 7 km south of Helmond.

== History ==
The village was first mentioned in 1155 as Lirdob. The etymology is unknown. Lierop develop along the Kleine Aa. A church was built in 1569.

The Holy Name of Jesus Church was built between 1890 and 1892, and has a large domed tower in Romano-Gothic style. There used to be four towers on the corner, but after war damage in 1944 only two have been restored.

Lierop was home to 288 people in 1840. Lierop was a separate municipality until 1935, when it became part of Someren.

The spoken language is Peellands (an East Brabantian dialect, which is very similar to colloquial Dutch).

Lierop is known internationally amongst motocross enthusiasts as a venue for the world championship Motocross Grand Prix series. The circuit was established in 1972, and is situated approximately 1 km from the village, stages Grand Prix events in September under the organisation of the local MAC Lierop club. The circuit, consisting of loamy sand, is seen as one of the toughest in Europe.

== Gallery ==
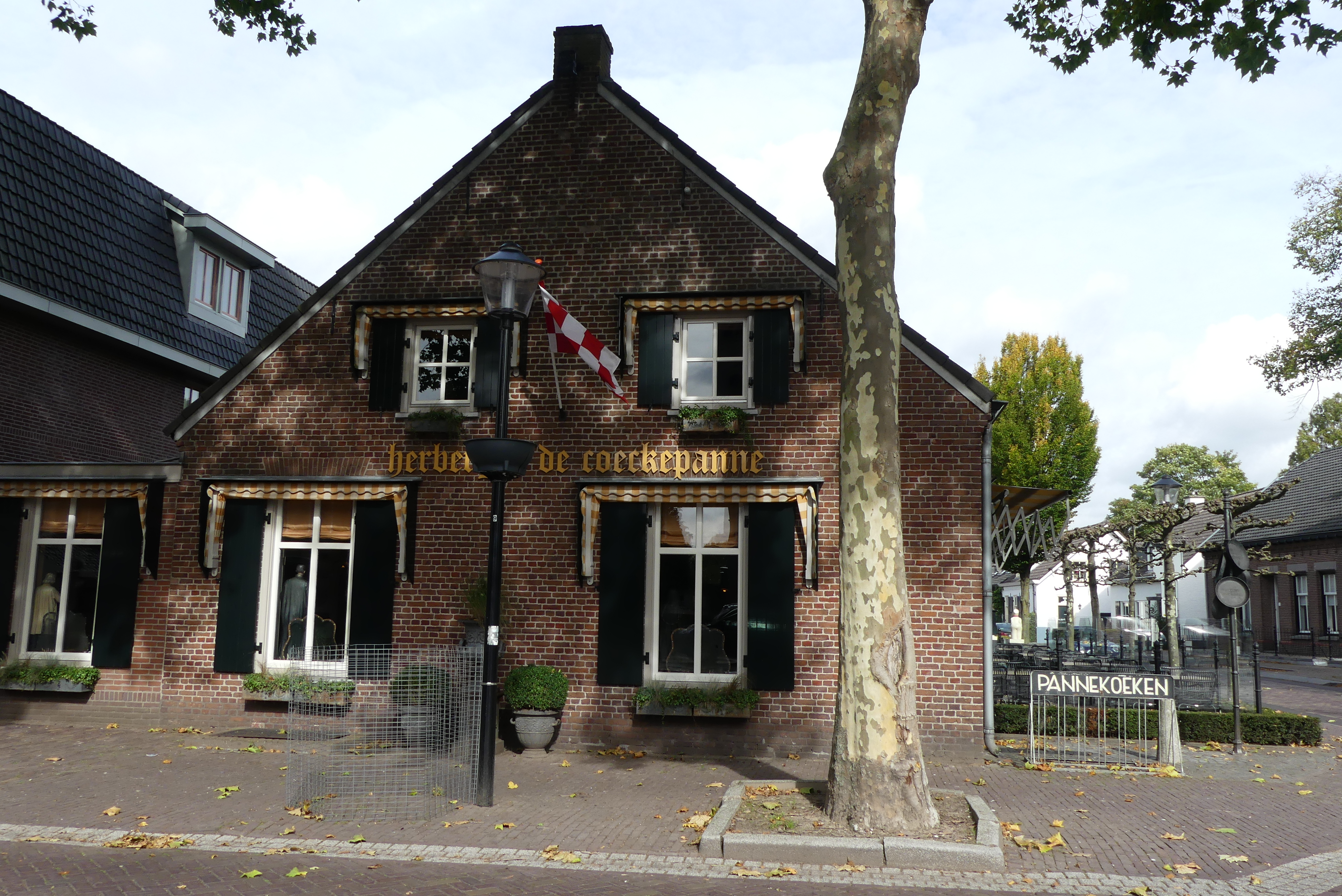
Inn de Coeckepanne

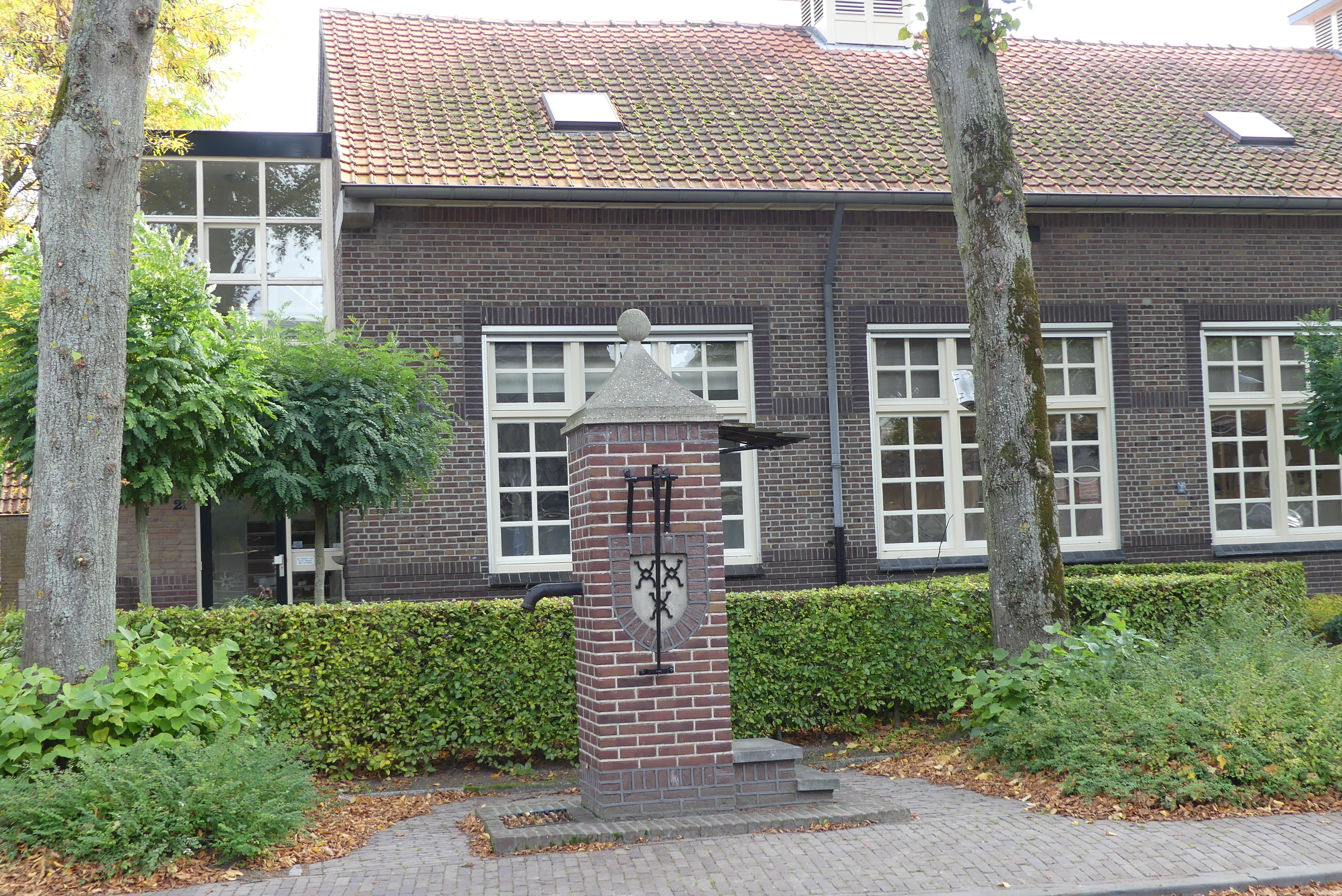
Village pump

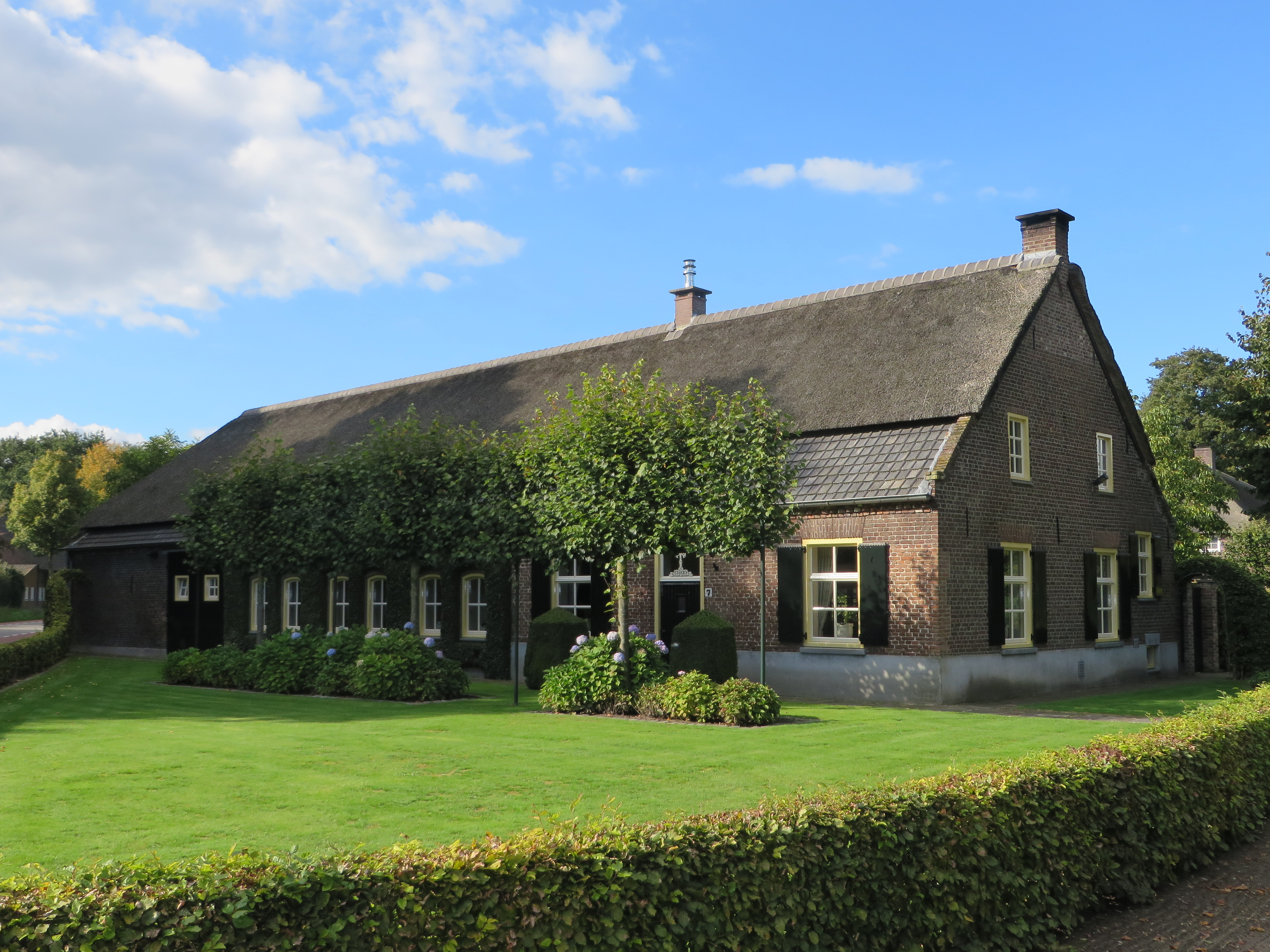
Farm in Lierop

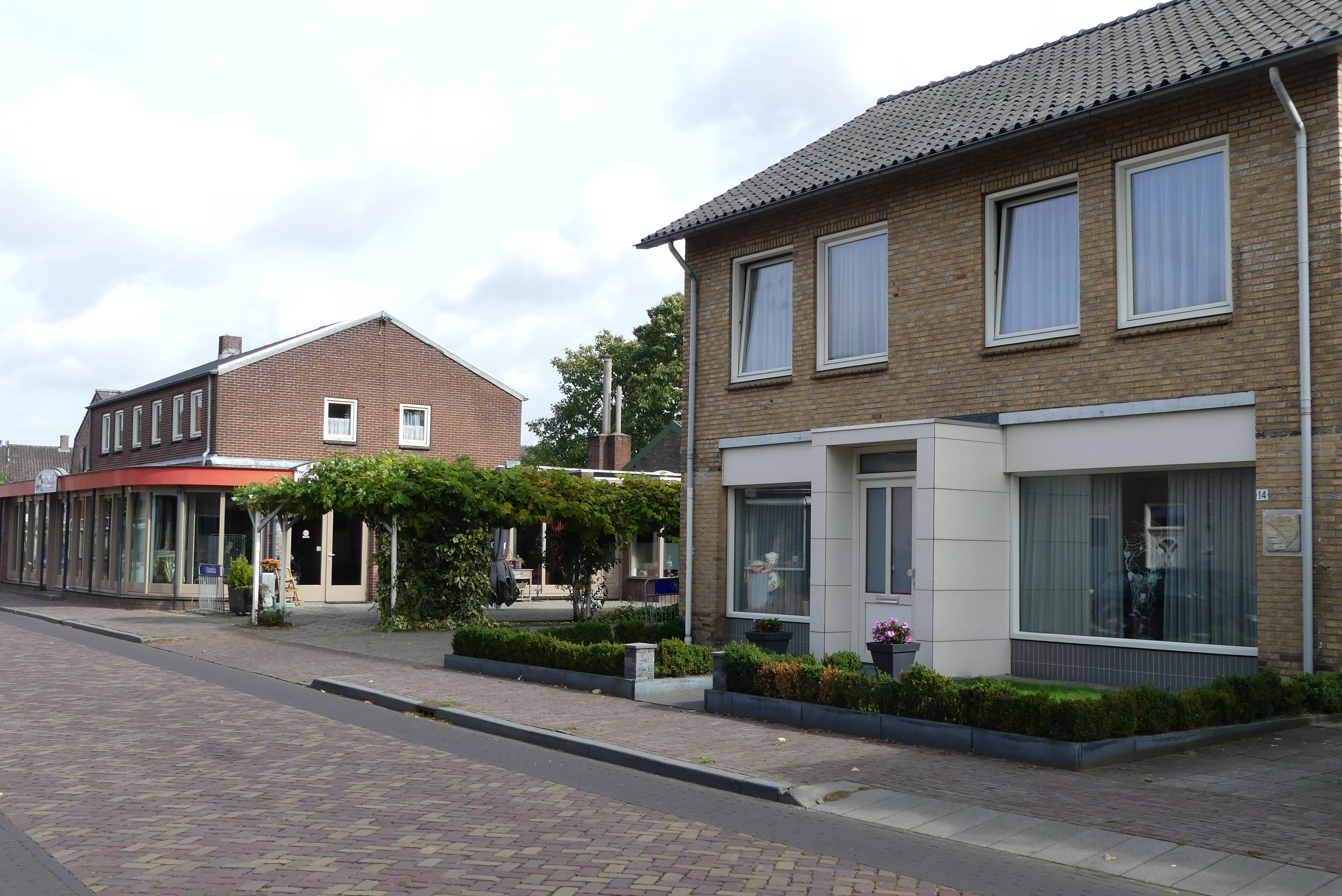
Street view
