= Orehova Vas, Hoče–Slivnica =

Orehova Vas
- Location in Slovenia
- Coordinates: 46°28′17.68″N 15°39′58.35″E
- Country: Slovenia
- Traditional region: Styria
- Statistical region: Drava
- Municipality: Hoče–Slivnica

Area
  - Total: 2.71 km^{2} (1.05 sq mi)
- Elevation: 268 m (879 ft)

Population (2002)
  - Total: 381

Orehova Vas (pronounced [ɔˈɾeːxɔʋa ˈʋaːs]; Slovene: Orehova vas) is a settlement in the Municipality of Hoče–Slivnica in northeastern Slovenia. It lies on the edge of the flatlands on the right bank of the Drava River south of Maribor. The area is part of the traditional region of Styria. The municipality is now included in the Drava Statistical Region.

A chapel-shrine in the village dates to the early 20th century.

The terminal building and much of the runway of Maribor Edvard Rusjan Airport is located at Orehova Vas.
