= List of motocross riders =

This is a partial list of notable current and former motocross riders, many of whom have competed in the World Championships, National Championships, and supercross competitions.

Contents:	Top – A B C D E F G H I J K L M N O P Q R S T U V W X Y Z – Nationalities – Notes – References

== A ==
Name	Seasons	World Championships	National Championships	Races	Wins
(Sweden) Bengt Åberg	1966–1979	500cc- 1969, 1970	–	–	12
(United States) Nate Adams	2002–2015	–	–	–	–
(Italy) Andrea Adamo	2019-Present	–	–	–	–
(South Africa) Greg Albertyn	1992–2000	125cc- 1992, 250cc- 1993, 1994	AMA 250cc- 1999	–	12
(United States) Mike Alessi	2004–2019	–	–	–	–
(United States) Jason Anderson	2014–present	–	250SX West, 2014, 450SX – 2019	–	8
(Sweden) Håkan Andersson	1966–1979	250cc- 1973	–	–	9
(United Kingdom) Max Anstie	2010-Present	SX2 World Supercross- 2023, 2025	–	–	–
(Soviet Union) Victor Arbekov	1963-1969	250cc- 1965	–	–	10
(United Kingdom) Les Archer, Jr.	1946-1967	500cc- 1956 European Champion	–	–	10

== B ==
Name	Seasons	World Championships	National Championships	Races	Wins
(Belgium) René Baeten	1947–1960	500cc- 1958	–	–	8
(United States) David Bailey	1979–1987	–	AMA 250cc- 1983; AMA SX- 1983; AMA 500cc- 1984, 1986	–	–
(United Kingdom) John Banks	1963-1977	–	–	–	4
(United States) Mark Barnett	1977–1985	–	AMA 125cc- 1980–1982; AMA SX- 1981	–	–
(Spain) Jonathan Barragan	2002–2012	–	–	–	–
(Italy) Andrea Bartolini	1988–2003	500cc- 1999	–	–	15
(Italy) Stefy Bau	1983–2005	–	AMA Women's MX- 1999, 2002	–	–
(Germany) Willy Bauer	1972–1978	–	–	–	4
(France) Jean-Michel Bayle	1986–1992	125cc- 1989, 250cc- 1990	AMA 250cc- 1991; AMA SX- 1991; AMA 500cc- 1991	–	15
(Germany) Pit Beirer	1989–2003	–	–	–	7
(Italy) Christian Beggi	–	–	–	–	–
(United States) Mike Bell	1977–1983, 1986, 1988–1989	1977 Four Stroke World Champion	AMA 250cc SX – 1980	–	–
(Netherlands) John van den Berk	1984–1995	125cc- 1987, 250cc- 1988	–	–	9
(Belgium) Marnicq Bervoets	1990–2001	–	–	–	19
(United Kingdom) Dave Bickers	1959–1968	–	–	–	18
(Switzerland) Julien Bill	2004-2014	MX3 – 2011	–	–	11
(Netherlands) Brian Bogers	2012-Present	–	–	–	-
(France) Frédéric Bolley	1997, 1999–2002	250cc- 1999, 2000	–	–	13
(Belgium) Sven Breugelmans	1999-2008	MX-3 – 2005, 2008	–	–	10
(United States) Mike Brown	1990–2013	–	AMA 125cc – 2001	–	3
(United States) Jimmy Button	1990–2000	–	–	–	–

== C ==
Name	Seasons	World Championships	National Championships	Races	Wins
(Italy) Antonio Cairoli	2002–2021	MX2- 2005, 2007; MX1- 2009, 2010, 2011, 2012, 2013; MXGP- 2014	–	–	26
(Spain) Carlos Campano	2003-2014	MX3- 2010	–	–	–
(Sweden) Håkan Carlqvist	1974–1988	500cc- 1983, 250cc- 1979	–	–	21
(United States) Ricky Carmichael	1996–2007	SX 2005	AMA 125cc- 1997–1999; AMA 125 SX East – 1998; AMA SX- 2001–2003, 2005–2006; AMA 250cc- 2000–2006	–	150
(United States) Danny Chandler	1976–1985	–	–	–	–
(United Kingdom) Eric Cheney	–	–	–	–	–
(Italy) Alessio Chiodi	1989–2009	125cc- 1997-1998-1999	–	–	27
(Czech Republic) Jaromír Čížek	1952-1966	250cc- 1958 European Champion	–	–	13
(Belgium) Lucas Coenen	2022–present	–	–	–	–
(Netherlands) Glenn Coldenhoff	2013–present	–	–	–	–
(New Zealand) Josh Coppins	1995–2008	–	British MX Open – 2004; British MX1 – 2005	–	10

== D ==
Name	Seasons	World Championships	National Championships	Races	Wins
(Australia) Craig Dack	1996–2006	–	–	–	–
(Belgium) Roger De Coster	1966–1980	500cc- 1971–1973, 1975, 1976	Belgian 500cc- 1966	1974–77 US TRANS-AMA Series Champion-	37
(Belgium) Ken De Dycker	1999–2018	–	British MX1-2006	–	–
(United States) Brian Deegan	1992–2009	–	–	–	–
(France) Yves Demaria	1993–2008	MX3- 2004, 2006, 2007	–	–	37
(Belgium) Clement Desalle	2006-2020	–	Belgian Champion 2009	–	2
(United States) Tony DiStefano	1973–1981	–	AMA 250cc- 1975–1977	–	16
(United Kingdom) James Dobb	1987–2004	125cc- 2001	British 125cc-1989, 1998–1999	–	11
(United States) John Dowd	1987–2013	–	–	–	–
(United Kingdom) John Draper	1948-1961	500cc- 1955 European Champion	–	–	5
(Netherlands) Lotte van Drunen	2022-Present	WMX- 2024, 2025	–	–	5
(New Zealand) Courtney Duncan	2016-Present	WMX- 2019-2021, 2023	–	–	22
(United States) Ryan Dungey	2006–2017	FIM SX – 2010, 2015, 2016, 2017	AMA SX Lites West – 2009; AMA 250 – 2009; AMA SX – 2010, 2015, 2016, 2017; AMA 450 – 2010, 2012, 2015	–	80

== E ==
Name	Seasons	World Championships	National Championships	Races	Wins
(United States) Daryl Ecklund	2007–2008	–	–	–	–
(United States) Bud Ekins	1949–1964	–	–	–	–
(United States) Jeff Emig	1988–1999	–	AMA 125cc- 1992; AMA 250cc- 1996–1997; AMA SX-1997	–	36
(Belgium) Harry Everts	1970–1984	250cc – 1975, 125cc – 1979-1981	–	–	25
(Belgium) Liam Everts	2021-Present	–	–	–	6
(Belgium) Stefan Everts	1988–2006	125cc- 1991; 250cc- 1995,1996,1997; 500cc- 2001–2002; MX1-GP- 2003, 2004, 2005, 2006	Belgium 125cc- 1990, Belgium 250cc- 1993	–	101

== F ==
Name	Seasons	World Championships	National Championships	Races	Wins
(France) Romain Febvre	2011–present	MXGP – 2015	–	–	9
(Spain) Rubén Fernández	2015-Present	–	–	–	–
(United States) Tim Ferry	1993–2009	–	AMA 125 SX East – 1997	–	–
(United States) Ashley Fiolek	2007–2013	–	WMA Pro National Champion – 2008, 2009, 2011, 2012, 2013	–	–
(United States) Sue Fish	1974–1985	–	WMX- 1976, 1977	–	–
(Costa Rica) Ernesto Fonseca	1999–2006	–	AMA SX 125cc East- 1999; AMA SX 125cc West- 2000	–	–
(Italy) Kiara Fontanesi	2010-Present	WMX- 2012-2015, 2017-2018	–	–	12
(East Germany) Paul Friedrichs	1965–1972	500cc- 1966, 1967, 1968	–	–	28

== G ==
Name	Seasons	World Championships	National Championships	Races	Wins
(Slovenia) Tim Gajser		MX2- 2015; MXGP- 2016		–	
(Belgium) Eric Geboers	1980–1990	125cc- 1982, 1983; 250cc- 1987; 500cc- 1988, 1990		–	38
(Belgium) Jago Geerts	2017-Present	–	–	–	–
(Slovenia) Klemen Gerčar	2008-2016	MX3- 2013	–	–	–
(Belgium) Dirk Geukens	1984–1996	–	–	–	2
(United States) Broc Glover	1976–1988	–	AMA 125cc- 1977–1979, AMA 500cc- 1981, 1983, 1985	–	–
(Spain) Mercedes Gonzalez	1970–1987	–	AMA AMA Women's MX- 1984–1991	–	–

== H ==
Name	Seasons	World Championships	National Championships	Races	Wins
(Sweden) Torsten Hallman	1959–1971	250cc- 1962, 1963, 1966, 1967	–	–	37
(Sweden) Christer Hammargren	1967–1976	–	500cc Swedish Motocross Championship- 1969, 1971	–	–
(United States) Bob Hannah	1976–1989	–	AMA AMA 125cc- 1976; AMA SX- 1977–1979; AMA 250cc- 1978, 1979	–	70
(Sweden) Torleif Hansen	1970–1983	–	250cc Swedish Motocross Championship- 1973, 1975-1978, 1982	–	10
(Sweden) Marcus Hansson	1987–1995	500cc- 1994	–	–	5
(United States) Doug Henry	1988–1999	–	AMA 125 SX East – 1993; AMA 125cc – 1993, 1994; AMA 250cc – 1998 *(YZM400F)	–	–
(United Kingdom) Rob Herring	–	–	British 250cc- 1989, 1991, 1992; British 125cc- 1990, 1991, 1992; British Open- 1996	–	4
(Netherlands) Jeffrey Herlings	2010–present	MX2- 2012, 2013, 2016	KNMV MX2- 2011, 2012	42	16
(Belgium) Jeremy Van Horebeek	2005-2022	–	–	–	2
(United States) Kent Howerton	1973–1983	–	AMA 500cc- 1976; AMA 250cc- 1980, 1981	–	–
(United Kingdom) Neil Hudson	1976–1983	250cc- 1981	–	–	7

== J ==
Name	Seasons	World Championships	National Championships	Races	Wins
(Belgium) Georges Jobé	1979–1992	250cc- 1980, 1983; 500cc- 1987, 1991, 1992	250cc- 1978, 1980–1983; 500cc- 1984, 1989	–	31
(Sweden) Peter Johansson	1990-2000	–	–	–	9
(United States) Rick Johnson	1980–1989	1983 Four Stroke World Champion	AMA 250cc- 1984, 1986, 1987; AMA 500cc- 1987, 1988; AMA SX- 1986, 1988	–	61
(Latvia) Pauls Jonass	2014-Present	MX-2- 2017	–	–	-
(United States) Gary Jones	1971–1978	–	AMA 250cc- 1972–1974	–	–
(United Kingdom) Mark Jones	–	–	–	–	–
(Sweden) Ake Jonsson	1963–1978	–	–	–	9

== K ==
Name	Seasons	World Championships	National Championships	Races	Wins
(Netherlands) Pierre Karsmakers	1967-1979	–	AMA 500cc- 1973; Dutch 500cc (1967, 1969, 1972)	–	FIM- 1 AMA- 23
(United States) Mike Kiedrowski	1988–1997	–	AMA 125cc- 1989, 1991; AMA 500cc- 1992; AMA 250cc- 1993	–	30
(New Zealand) Darryl King	1987–2007	–	Aus. 500cc- 2001, 2003, 2004	–	5
(New Zealand) Shayne King	1987–2007	500cc- 1996	NZ National Champion- 2003	–	6
(Austria) Heinz Kinigadner	1978–1988	250cc- 1984, 1985	–	–	7
(Canada) Dusty Klatt	–	–	Can. MX1- 2006	–	–
(Sweden) Arne Kring	1969–1975	–	Swedish 500cc - 1974	–	7

== L ==
Name	Seasons	World Championships	National Championships	Races	Wins
(United States) Brad Lackey	1971–1982	500cc- 1982	AMA 500cc- 1972	–	7
(United Kingdom) Arthur Lampkin	1959-1968	–	–	–	7
(United States) Steve Lamson	1989–2006	–	AMA 125cc- 1995, 1996	–	–
(France) Livia Lancelot	2008-Present	WMX- 2008, 2016	–	–	15
(Germany) Simon Längenfelder	2020-Present	MX2- 2025	–	–	-
(South Africa) Grant Langston	1997–2008, 2010	125cc- 2000	AMA 125cc – 2003; AMA 125 SX East – 2005; AMA SX Lites West – 2006; AMA 250cc- 2007	–	7
(United States) Danny LaPorte	1976–1983	250cc- 1982	AMA 500cc- 1979	–	6
(United States) Mike LaRocco	1988–2006	–	AMA 250cc- 1994, AMA 500cc- 1993	–	–
(Australia) Jeff Leisk	1984, 1988–1990	–	8 x Australian Motocross Champion	–	3
(Sweden) Ove Lundell	1958–1965	–	–	–	1
(Sweden) Sten Lundin	1955–1966	500cc- 1959, 1961	–	–	24
(United States) Jeremy Lusk	–	–	–	–	–

== M ==
Name	Seasons	World Championships	National Championships	Races	Wins
(United Kingdom) Billy MacKenzie	1999–2013	–	ACU Maxxis British Motocross Championship – MX1 – 2007–2008	–	–
(Italy) Corrado Maddii	1973–1990	–	–	–	5
(Belgium) André Malherbe	1973–1986	500cc- 1980, 1981, 1983	–	–	41
(Belgium) Jacky Martens	1984–1997	500cc- 1993	–	–	17
(France) Mickael Maschio	1992-2005	125cc- 2002	–	–	8
(United States) Mary McGee	1960–63	–	–	–	
(United States) Jeremy McGrath	1989–2003, 2006		AMA 250cc- 1995; AMA SX 1993–1996, 1998–2000	–	89
(Australia) Andrew McFarlane	2000–2010	–	–	–	4
(Finland) Heikki Mikkola	1969–1979	500cc- 1974, 1977, 1978; 250cc- 1976	–	–	34
(New Zealand) Ivan Miller	1964–1983	–	Aus. 500cc- 1971, NZ open- 1977/78, 1979/80, 1980/81	–	
(Belgium) Auguste Mingels	1947-1957	500cc European motocross champion- 1953, 1954	–	–	8
(Soviet Union) Guennady Moisseev	1967–1979	250cc- 1974, 1977, 1978	–	–	14
(United States) Bobby Moore	1980–1995	125cc – 1994	AMA 125cc West SX – 1985	–	13
(Canada) Blair Morgan	1993–2008		Can. 125/250cc- 1997, 1999	–	–
(France) Marvin Musquin	2008–2023	MX2- 2009, 2010	–	–	–

== N ==
Name	Seasons	World Championships	National Championships	Races	Wins
(Germany) Maximilian Nagl	2003-2019	–	–	–	
(United Kingdom) Dave Nicoll	1964–1978	–	–	–	1
(United Kingdom) Kurt Nicoll	1982–1994	–	–	–	13
(Sweden) Bill Nilsson	1957–1967	500cc- 1957, 1960	–	–	18
(United Kingdom) Graham Noyce	1976–1984	500cc- 1979	–	–	6

== O ==
Name	Seasons	World Championships	National Championships	Races	Wins
(Denmark) Thomas Kjær Olsen	2020-Present	EMX 250cc- 2016	–	–	
(United States) Johnny O'Mara	1980-1990	–	AMA 125cc MX- 1983; AMA SX- 1984	–	-

== P ==
Name	Seasons	World Championships	National Championships	Races	Wins
(United States) Trampas Parker	1985–2004	125cc- 1989; 250cc- 1991	–	–	13
(United States) Travis Pastrana	1999–2006, 2009, 2018	–	AMA 125cc MX- 2000; 125cc East SX- 2001	–	–
(United States) Jessica Patterson	1999–2013	–	AMA Women's MX- 2000, 2004, 2005, 2006, 2007, 2008, 2010	–	–
(France) Gautier Paulin	2008–2020	–	–	–	–
(Italy) David Philippaerts	2000-2014	MX-1 – 2008	–	–	9
(France) Mickael Pichon	1992-2009	250cc- 2001, 2002	AMA 125cc East SX- 1995, 1996	–	37
(United States) Jim Pomeroy	1973–1978	–	–	–	1
(France) Christophe Pourcel	2004-2017	MX2 – 2006	AMA SX Lites East – 2009	–	–
(France) Sébastien Pourcel	2002–2014	–	–	–	–
(Spain) Jorge Prado	2016–Present	MX2- 2018, 2019; MXGP- 2023, 2024	–	–	–
(South Africa) Katherine Prumm	1998-2009	WMX- 2006, 2007	–	–	–
(Italy) Alessandro Puzar	1988–2009	250cc- 1990; 125cc- 1995	–	–	23

== R ==
Name	Seasons	World Championships	National Championships	Races	Wins
(Belgium) Gaston Rahier	1967–1982	125cc – 1975 – 1977	–	–	29
(Belgium) Steve Ramon	1997–2013	125cc – 2003, MX1 – 2007	Bel. MX1- 2004, 2006	–	–
(South Africa) Tyla Rattray	1999–2015	MX2 – 2008	Ned. 125cc- 2003	–	13
(Australia) Chad Reed	1999–2020	SX 2003, 2008	Aus. SX- 1999, 2000, 2009; AMA 125 SX East – 2002; AMA SX- 2004, 2008; AMA 450- 2009	–	–
(France) Maxime Renaux	2016-Present	–	–	–	–
(France) Pierre Renet	–	MX3- 2009	–	–	–
(Italy) Michéle Rinaldi	1978–1987	125cc – 1984	–	–	13
(Belgium) Joël Robert	1964–1975	250cc- 1964, 1968–1972	–	–	50
(Germany) Ken Roczen	2010–present	MX2 – 2011	AMA 450 – 2014	–	–
(Canada) Jean Sebastien Roy	?-2006	–	Can. 250cc- 2001–2005	–	–

== S ==
Name	Seasons	World Championships	National Championships	Races	Wins
(United States) Donny Schmit	1987–1995	125cc- 1990, 250cc- 1992	AMA 125cc West SX – 1986	–	15
(Germany) Herbert Schmitz	1971-1982	–	German motocross national champion- 1977–1979	–	–
(United Kingdom) Tommy Searle	2006–2019	–	–	–	–
(Switzerland) Jeremy Seewer	2012-Present	–	–	–	–
(United Kingdom) Shaun Simpson	2004–2021	–	ACU Maxxis British Motocross Championship- MX2- 2008 MX1- 2014–2015, Belgian Championship- MX1- 2011	–	–
(Belgium) Joël Smets	1989–2005	500cc- 1995, 1997–1998, 2000, 650cc- 2003	–	–	57
(United Kingdom) Jeff Smith	1955–1970	500cc- 1964–1965	–	–	30
(United States) Marty Smith	1974–1982	–	AMA 125cc- 1974, 1975; AMA 500cc- 1977	–	18
(United States) Steve Stackable	1974–1981	–	AMA 500cc SX – 1975	–	–
(United States) Jeff Stanton	1986–1993	–	AMA 250cc- 1989, 1990, 1992; AMA SX-1989, 1990, 1992	–	–
(Czech Republic) Jiří Stodůlka	1968–1973	–	Czech motocross national champion (1968 – 250cc, 1972 – 500cc)	–	1
(United Kingdom) Brian Stonebridge	1950–1959	–	–	–	6
(Netherlands) David Strijbos	1984–1994	125cc- 1986	–	–	27
(Belgium) Kevin Strijbos	2000–2021	–	–	–	5
(United States) Chuck Sun	1976–1983	–	AMA 500cc- 1980	–	–

== T ==
Name	Seasons	World Championships	National Championships	Races	Wins
(United States) Ivan Tedesco	1999–2012, 2014	–	AMA SX Lites West – 2004, 2005	–	–
(United Kingdom) David Thorpe	1979–1993	500cc – 1985, 1986, 1989	–	–	22
(Sweden) Rolf Tibblin	1957–1967	500cc – 1962, 1963	–	–	29
(France) Jordi Tixier	2009-Present	MX2- 2014	–	–	-
(United States) Eli Tomac	2010–present	–	AMA 250cc – 2013 AMA 450cc – 2017, 2018, 2019	–	75
(France) Sebastien Tortelli	1994–2006	125cc- 1996; 250cc- 1999	–	–	20
(New Zealand) Ben Townley	2000–2017	MX2- 2004	AMA SX Lites East – 2007	–	14
(Netherlands) Pedro Tragter	1985–1995	125cc- 1993	–	–	7
(United States) Marty Tripes	1973-1980	–	–	–	1

== V ==
Name	Seasons	World Championships	National Championships	Races	Wins
(Czech Republic) Vlastimil Válek	1960–1972	–	Czech motocross national champion (500cc: 1959, 1966, 1967/ 250cc: 1961, 1963/ 175cc: 1960, 1963, 1964)	–	6
(Finland) Pekka Vehkonen	1982–1993	125cc – 1985	–	–	17
(Belgium) Jaak van Velthoven	1970–1983	–	–	–	5
(Netherlands) Kees van der Ven	1979–1987	–	–	–	17
(Netherlands) Nancy van der Ven	2023-Present	WMX- 2022	–	–	-
(France) Tom Vialle	2019-Present	MX2- 2020, 2022	AMA SX 250cc East- 2024, 2025	–	-
(United States) Ryan Villopoto	2005–2015	FIM SX – 2011, 2012, 2013, 2014	AMA MX Lites- 2006, 2007, 2008; AMA SX Lites West- 2007; AMA SX – 2011, 2012, 2013, 2014; AMA 450 – 2011, 2013	–	72
(France) Jacky Vimond	1981–1986	250cc – 1986	–	–	13
(Netherlands) Calvin Vlaanderen	2011-Present	–	–	–	–
(United States) Heath Voss	1996–2010	FIM SX – 2004	–	–	–
(France) David Vuillemin	1995–2009	–	Fra. SX 125cc- 1996, 1997	–	6

== W ==
Name	Seasons	World Championships	National Championships	Races	Wins
(Austria) Matthias Walkner	2012	MX3 – 2012	–	–	–
(United States) Jeff Ward	1978–1992	–	AMA 125cc- 1984; AMA 250cc- 1985, 1988; AMA 500cc- 1989, 1990; AMA SX- 1985, 1987	–	56
(Japan) Akira Watanabe	1973–1987	125cc – 1978	–	–	7
(United States) Cooper Webb	2013–present	–	AMA 250SX Western Regional – 2015, 2016 AMA 250cc – 2016 AMA 450SX – 2019	–	–
(Germany) Adolf Weil	1970–1977	–	–	–	7
(United States) Jimmy Weinert	1970–1980	–	AMA 500cc- 1974, 1975; AMA SX- 1976	–	22
(New Zealand) Mike Whiddett	1987–2006	–	–	–	–
(United States) Kevin Windham	1994–2013, 2018	–	AMA 250SX Western Regional – 1996, 1997	–	–
(Netherlands) Kay de Wolf	2021-Present	MX2- 2024	–	–	–
(Netherlands) Gerrit Wolsink	1970–1981	1975– 3rd,1976–2nd, 1977–3rd, 1979–2nd 500cc	–	5 time USGP Winner, 1984 ISDT winner	14

== World Championships by nationality ==
Country	500cc / MX3	Country	250cc / MX1	Country	125cc / MX2
Belgium	24	Belgium	18	Belgium	9
Sweden	10	Sweden	6	France	6
United Kingdom	6	France	6	Italy	6
France	4	Italy	5	Netherlands	3
East Germany	3	(Soviet Union) USSR	4	South Africa	3
Finland	3	United States	3	United States	3
Italy	1	Austria	2	Finland	1
New Zealand	1	South Africa	2	Japan	1
United States	1	Finland	1	New Zealand	1
Spain	1	Netherlands	1	United Kingdom	1
Switzerland	1	United Kingdom	1	Germany	1
