= 2006 FIM Motocross World Championship =

Motocross championship season

2006 Motocross World Championship

Seasons
- ← 2005 2007 →

The 2006 FIM Motocross World Championship was the 50th F.I.M. Motocross Racing World Championship season. In the MX1 class, Stefan Everts took his tenth world title in what was his final season in before retirement. In the MX2 class Christophe Pourcel won his one and only world title, while in MX3 Yves Demaria took his second crown.

== MX1 ==
=== Calendar and Results ===
Round	Date	Grand Prix	Location	Race 1 Winner	Race 2 Winner	Round Winner
MX1
1	April 2	Belgium	Zolder	(France) Sébastien Tortelli	(Belgium) Stefan Everts	(Belgium) Stefan Everts
2	April 16	Spain	Bellpuig	(Belgium) Kevin Strijbos	(Belgium) Stefan Everts	(Belgium) Stefan Everts
3	April 23	Portugal	Águeda	(Belgium) Stefan Everts	(Belgium) Stefan Everts	(Belgium) Stefan Everts
4	May 7	Germany	Teutschenthal	(Belgium) Stefan Everts	(Belgium) Stefan Everts	(Belgium) Stefan Everts
5	May 21	Japan	Sugo	(Belgium) Stefan Everts	(Belgium) Stefan Everts	(Belgium) Stefan Everts
6	June 4	Bulgaria	Sevlievo	(Belgium) Stefan Everts	(Belgium) Stefan Everts	(Belgium) Stefan Everts
7	June 11	Italy	Montevarchi	(Belgium) Stefan Everts	(Belgium) Stefan Everts	(Belgium) Stefan Everts
8	June 18	United Kingdom	Matterley Basin	(Belgium) Stefan Everts	(Belgium) Stefan Everts	(Belgium) Stefan Everts
9	July 2	Sweden	Uddevalla	(Belgium) Stefan Everts	(Belgium) Stefan Everts	(Belgium) Stefan Everts
10	July 16	South Africa	Sun City	(Belgium) Stefan Everts	(Belgium) Stefan Everts	(Belgium) Stefan Everts
11	July 30	Czech Republic	Loket	(Belgium) Stefan Everts	(Belgium) Stefan Everts	(Belgium) Stefan Everts
12	August 6	Belgium	Namur	(Belgium) Stefan Everts	(Belgium) Stefan Everts	(Belgium) Stefan Everts
13	August 27	Northern Ireland	Desertmartin	(Belgium) Stefan Everts	(New Zealand) Josh Coppins	(New Zealand) Josh Coppins
14	September 3	Netherlands	Lierop	(Belgium) Stefan Everts	(Belgium) Stefan Everts	(Belgium) Stefan Everts
15	September 17	France	Ernee	(Belgium) Stefan Everts	(Belgium) Stefan Everts	(Belgium) Stefan Everts

=== Riders Championship ===
Pos	Rider	Bike	BEL (Belgium)		ESP (Spain)		POR (Portugal)		GER (Germany)		JPN (Japan)		BUL (Bulgaria)		ITA (Italy)		GBR (United Kingdom)		SWE (Sweden)		RSA (South Africa)		CZE (Czech Republic)		BEL (Belgium)		NIR (Northern Ireland)		NED (Netherlands)		FRA (France)		Points
1	(Belgium) Stefan Everts	Yamaha	2	1	3	1	1	1	1	1	1	1	1	1	1	1	1	1	1	1	1	1	1	1	1	1	1	2	1	1	1	1	739
2	(Belgium) Kevin Strijbos	Suzuki	8	3	1	Ret	4	3	2	4	12	4	2	2	2	2	4	2	6	3	9	5	6	2	8	4	4	5	6	4	3	4	529
3	(Belgium) Steve Ramon	Suzuki	4	5	6	3	7	Ret	9	5	4	2	3	3	4	4	14	3	4	2	3	3	4	5	3	3	11	Ret	3	5	7	6	483
4	(Belgium) Ken De Dycker	Honda	5	7	5	6	3	5	5	3	2	8	7	6	3	7	2	7	8	9	5	7	5	6	5	19	3	4	5	12	5	8	463
5	(Estonia) Tanel Leok	Kawasaki	3	4	2	2	6	4	6	2	3	12	9	4	7	3	6	4	5	Ret	4	4	8	9	Ret	11	12	8	4	Ret	4	3	443
6	(Spain) Jonathan Barragan	KTM	6	9	4	7	5	2	3	Ret	8	3	24	Ret	5	Ret	12	6	2	Ret	13	6	3	4	Ret	DNS	8	3	9	3	2	5	376
7	(New Zealand) Josh Coppins	Honda	DNQ	DNQ													3	5	3	5	2	2	2	3	2	2	2	1	2	2	6	2	330
8	(Belgium) Manuel Priem	Yamaha	Ret	12	13	8	13	6	13	10	9	6	14	Ret	19	9	15	11	Ret	11	8	12	11	10	13	8	7	6	8	6	17	14	278
9	(France) Pascal Leuret	Honda	7	10	11	9	15	8	8	7			5	7	10	8	9	Ret	Ret	Ret	7	8	9	17	7	7	16	14	21	16	10	12	267
10	(United Kingdom) James Noble	Honda	17	11	9	18	8	23	Ret	14	7	7	21	19	Ret	11	11	12	10	8	Ret	15	7	12	11	6	Ret	9	19	19	9	9	226
11	(Belgium) Cedric Melotte	Yamaha	9	8	10	4	9	Ret	4	Ret	6	15	Ret	DNS	8	Ret	5	8	11	Ret	6	Ret	16	8	4	5							224
12	(Spain) Francisco Garcia Vico	Honda	11	Ret	16	11	11	11	Ret	9	18	Ret	10	8	6	5	8	10	9	7	14	Ret			9	9	DNQ	DNQ			16	Ret	201
13	(Republic of Ireland) Gordon Crockard	Honda	DNQ	DNQ	Ret	DNS	12	13	Ret	Ret			11	17	13	20	7	Ret	7	4	15	11	20	7	6	16	5	Ret	Ret	DNS	12	10	173
14	(Finland) Antti Pyrhönen	TM	13	15	12	16	18	10	14	15	15	13	16	13	Ret	12	18	Ret	16	14	11	9	Ret	Ret	17	15	9	10	Ret	Ret	18	17	168
15	(Switzerland) Julien Bill	Yamaha	24	23	8	12	17	7	7	8	11	Ret	8	21	9	16	10	13	13	10	10	10	Ret	DNS									167
16	(Belgium) Marvin van Daele	Honda	16	14	19	13	16	17	10	13	10	5	13	9	Ret	10	Ret	9	14	Ret							21	19	12	13	20	13	155
17	(Denmark) Brian Jorgensen	Honda	Ret	13	22	10	14	20	11	6	5	Ret	4	5	18	6	DNQ	DNQ	12	19			Ret	DNS					Ret	DNS	8	Ret	144
18	(South Africa) Wyatt Avis	KTM	14	Ret	DNQ	DNQ	21	9	Ret	19			6	14	Ret	18	DNQ	DNQ			12	13	10	11	10	10	Ret	DNS	Ret	7	Ret	Ret	120
19	(Hungary) Kornel Nemeth	Suzuki																	17	6			14	13	Ret	Ret	6	7	14	9	11	7	106
20	(Belgium) Danny Theybers	Suzuki	15	Ret	14	15	Ret	14	17	12	13	10	19	Ret	16	13	16	21	15	21			Ret	Ret	12	12			DNQ	DNQ			102
21	(France) Sébastien Tortelli	KTM	1	2	7	5	2	Ret																									99
22	(Latvia) Lauris Freibergs	Suzuki	21	18	Ret	22	20	12	DNQ	DNQ			20	16	12	14	17	23	21	12			15	20	21	18	23	12	15	8	DNQ	19	88
23	(Italy) Alex Salvini	Suzuki	Ret	Ret	17	Ret	Ret	15	15	Ret			17	10	11	15	Ret	18	Ret	16			13	14	18	Ret	Ret	21	13	Ret	19	Ret	83
24	(Netherlands) Bas Verhoeven	Kawasaki	12	16	DNQ	25	Ret	22	21	21			18	15	21	22	25	20	DNQ	24			18	Ret	Ret	14	22	17	7	10	21	11	73
25	(Belgium) Clement Desalle	Suzuki	DNQ	DNQ	DNQ	23	22	21	20	22			12	12	15	21	Ret	25	19	18			12	23	14	20	Ret	Ret	16	15	14	16	70
26	(Sweden) Jonny Lindhe	KTM	25	24	15	26	Ret	16	19	20	16	17	Ret	24	23	Ret	24	17	18	DNS			21	Ret	Ret	Ret	18	11	18	20	DNQ	DNQ	47
27	(United Kingdom) Mark Jones	Honda															13	16									15	Ret	Ret	11	13	15	43
28	(United Kingdom) Stephen Sword	Kawasaki	10	6	Ret	DNS	10	18	DNS	DNS																							40
29	(Italy) Claudio Federici	Kawasaki	19	Ret	Ret	Ret	19	Ret	16	Ret			15	11	Ret	Ret	19	14	Ret	DNS			Ret	Ret					DNQ	DNQ	DNQ	DNQ	34
30	(Latvia) Aigars Bobkovs	Honda	22	21	23	14	23	Ret	12	16			Ret	18	DNQ	DNQ	21	19	22	20			Ret	18	DNQ	DNQ			20	Ret	DNQ	DNQ	31
31	(Sweden) Marcus Norlen	Suzuki	DNQ	20	DNQ	DNQ	DNQ	DNQ	DNQ	Ret			DNQ	20	DNQ	DNQ	DNQ	DNQ	DNQ	DNQ					DNQ	DNQ	19	13	10	14	DNQ	DNQ	30
32	(Belgium) Jonas Salaets	Yamaha			DNQ	DNQ	24	19	DNQ	DNQ			23	Ret	20	Ret	DNQ	DNQ							DNQ	DNQ	13	16	11	18	DNQ	DNQ	29
33	(Finland) Marko Kovalainen	Honda			Ret	24	DNQ	DNQ	18	Ret							Ret	Ret	20	13			17	15	16	Ret	Ret	Ret	Ret	Ret	Ret	Ret	27
34	(South Africa) Neville Bradshaw	Suzuki															20	15	23	15							17	15					23
35	(South Africa) Collin Dugmore	Kawasaki							Ret	11											16	14											22
36	(Japan) Akira Narita	Yamaha									14	9																					19
37	(Italy) Christian Beggi	Honda																							Ret	13	10	Ret			23	Ret	19
38	(Slovenia) Roman Jelen	Suzuki			21	21	DNQ	DNQ	Ret	17					14	17																	15
39	(United Kingdom) Mark Hucklebridge	Kawasaki	18	19	18	17	Ret	Ret	Ret	18	Ret	Ret			DNQ	DNQ	DNQ	DNQ															15
40	(Japan) Shinichi Kaga	Suzuki									19	11																					12
41	(Japan) Kazumasa Masuda	Honda									17	14																					11
42	(France) Cyrille Coulon	Suzuki							Ret	Ret													22	19	15	Ret					25	18	11
43	(United Kingdom) Wayne Smith	Honda																									14	18					10
44	(South Africa) Liam O'Farrel	Yamaha																			18	16											8
45	(Spain) Aaron Bernardez	Honda			Ret	Ret																	19	16	Ret	Ret	Ret	Ret	Ret	Ret	DNQ	DNQ	7
46	(South Africa) Karl Stegen	Suzuki																			17	18											7
47	(France) Julien Vanni	KTM			DNQ	DNQ	DNQ	DNQ	Ret	DNS			22	23	DNQ	DNQ									DNQ	DNQ	DNQ	DNQ	DNQ	DNQ	15	22	6
48	(Czech Republic) Josef Dobes	Suzuki	Ret	17	Ret	DNS									Ret	19	Ret	Ret	24	22			DNQ	Ret	22	Ret							6
49	(Japan) Shinobu Idehara	Yamaha									Ret	16																					5
50	(New Zealand) Scott Columb	Suzuki					DNQ	DNQ	DNQ	DNQ			26	Ret	DNQ	DNQ	22	24	25	23			DNQ	DNQ	23	17	20	Ret	DNQ	DNQ	24	21	5
51	(Slovenia) Jaka Moze	Honda											25	25	17	23									20	Ret							5
52	(Netherlands) Mike Kras	Suzuki																											22	17			4
53	(Netherlands) Anne Advokaat	Honda																											17	Ret			4
54	(France) Thomas Allier	Kawasaki													Ret	Ret	DNQ	DNQ	Ret	17			DNQ	DNQ									4
55	(South Africa) Richard van der Westhuizen	Honda																			Ret	17											4
56	(Japan) Kohiji Ohkawara	Yamaha									21	18																					3
57	(Japan) Takeshi Koikeda	Yamaha									20	19																					3
58	(Switzerland) Marc Ristori	Honda																							19	Ret							2
59	(South Africa) Kyle Bowen	KTM																			Ret	19											2
60	(Greece) Dimitris Keramidas	Honda																			19	Ret											2
61	(Spain) Alvaro Lozano	KTM	23	22	20	20																											2
62	(France) Rodrig Thain	Kawasaki																							DNQ	DNQ	DNQ	DNQ	DNQ	DNQ	22	20	1
63	(Belgium) Tom de Belder	Suzuki			DNQ	DNQ	Ret	Ret					27	22	DNQ	DNQ											24	20					1
64	(Kenya) Anthony Nielsen	Yamaha																			22	20											1
65	(South Africa) Carl van Niekerk	TM																			20	Ret											1
66	(Japan) Masaki Hiratsuka	Kawasaki									23	20																					1
67	(Netherlands) Erik Eggens	Kawasaki	20	Ret																													1
	(Czech Republic) Martin Michek	Suzuki																					Ret	21	DNQ	DNQ			23	21			0
	(Namibia) Tommy Gous	Yamaha																			21	22											0
	(Namibia) Ronnie Adams	Suzuki																			23	21											0
	(United Kingdom) Glen Phillips	Yamaha															23	22															0
	(Japan) Taichi Kugimura	Yamaha									22	Ret																					0
	(Italy) Alessandro Cinelli	Honda													22	Ret																	0
	(Czech Republic) Petr Masarik	Honda																					DNQ	22									0
	(Austria) Michael Staufer	KTM																					23	Ret									0
	(France) Mickaël Pichon	KTM	Ret	DNS																											Ret	DNS	0
	(Japan) Tetsuya Mizoguchi	Kawasaki									Ret	Ret																					0
	(France) Vincent Turpin	Yamaha																													Ret	Ret	0
	(France) Yves Demaria	KTM																													Ret	Ret	0
	(Japan) Yoshihide Fukudome	Honda									Ret	DNS																					0
	(Netherlands) Heikki van den Berg	Honda																											DNQ	Ret			0
	(United Kingdom) David Reeve	Honda																			DNS	DNS											0
	(United Kingdom) Martin Barr	Yamaha	DNQ	DNQ	DNQ	DNQ	DNQ	DNQ	DNQ	DNQ							DNQ	DNQ															0
	(Italy) Luca Cherubini	Kawasaki	DNQ	DNQ	DNQ	DNQ	DNQ	DNQ																									0
	(Italy) Matteo Dottori	Kawasaki													DNQ	DNQ													DNQ	DNQ	DNQ	DNQ	0
	(France) Franck Verhaeghe	Yamaha																					DNQ	DNQ	DNQ	DNQ			DNQ	DNQ			0
	(Czech Republic) Radomir Harbich	Suzuki																							DNQ	DNQ			DNQ	DNQ	DNQ	DNQ	0
	(Russia) Dimitry Parshin	Suzuki	DNQ	DNQ					DNQ	DNQ																							0
	(United Kingdom) Bryan MacKenzie	Kawasaki															DNQ	DNQ									DNQ	DNQ					0
	(France) Mickaël Maschio	Kawasaki	DNQ	DNQ																													0
	(France) Alexandre Rouis	Kawasaki	DNQ	DNQ																													0
	(Austria) Philip Rüf	Suzuki	DNQ	DNQ																													0
	(Portugal) Hugo Santos	Honda					DNQ	DNQ																									0
	(Portugal) Luis Correia	Suzuki					DNQ	DNQ																									0
	(Portugal) Sandro Marcos	Suzuki					DNQ	DNQ																									0
	(Germany) Sebastian Paasch	Suzuki							DNQ	DNQ																							0
	(Germany) Andreas Huber	Suzuki							DNQ	DNQ																							0
	(Bulgaria) Nikolay Kumanov	Yamaha							DNQ	DNQ																							0
	(Bulgaria) Todor Totev	Honda											DNQ	DNQ																			0
	(Bulgaria) Ivailo Deev	Kawasaki											DNQ	DNQ																			0
	(Bulgaria) Martin Todorov	Yamaha											DNQ	DNQ																			0
	(Italy) Felice Compagnone	Yamaha													DNQ	DNQ																	0
	(Italy) Manuel Beconcini	Yamaha													DNQ	DNQ																	0
	(United Kingdom) Jason Higgs	Honda															DNQ	DNQ															0
	(Sweden) Stefan Andersson	Yamaha																	DNQ	DNQ													0
	(Sweden) Magnus Lindfors	Yamaha																	DNQ	DNQ													0
	(Sweden) Andreas Toresson	Suzuki																	DNQ	DNQ													0
	(Denmark) Tonni Andersen	Suzuki																	DNQ	DNQ													0
	(Norway) Ronny Bakke	Honda																	DNQ	DNQ													0
	(Austria) Oswald Reisinger	Honda																					DNQ	DNQ									0
	(Czech Republic) Jiri Cepelak	Kawasaki																					DNQ	DNQ									0
	(Czech Republic) Petr Bartos	Suzuki																					DNQ	DNQ									0
	(Belgium) Gilles Dejong	Honda																							DNQ	DNQ							0
	(Republic of Ireland) Philip McCullough	KTM																									DNQ	DNQ					0
	(United Kingdom) Robert Hamilton	Yamaha																									DNQ	DNQ					0
	(Netherlands) Hans Vogels	Yamaha																											DNQ	DNQ			0
	(France) Mickaël Musquin	Yamaha																													DNQ	DNQ	0
Pos	Rider	Bike	BEL (Belgium)		ESP (Spain)		POR (Portugal)		GER (Germany)		JPN (Japan)		BUL (Bulgaria)		ITA (Italy)		GBR (United Kingdom)		SWE (Sweden)		RSA (South Africa)		CZE (Czech Republic)		BEL (Belgium)		NIR (Northern Ireland)		NED (Netherlands)		FRA (France)		Points

== MX2 ==
=== Calendar and Results ===
Round	Date	Grand Prix	Location	Race 1 Winner	Race 2 Winner	Round Winner
MX2
1	April 2	Belgium	Zolder	(Italy) David Philippaerts	(South Africa) Tyla Rattray	(South Africa) Tyla Rattray
2	April 16	Spain	Bellpuig	(Norway) Kenneth Gundersen	(Italy) Tony Cairoli	(South Africa) Tyla Rattray
3	April 23	Portugal	Águeda	(Italy) Tony Cairoli	(South Africa) Tyla Rattray	(South Africa) Tyla Rattray
4	May 7	Germany	Teutschenthal	(France) Christophe Pourcel	(France) Christophe Pourcel	(France) Christophe Pourcel
5	May 21	Japan	Sugo	(United Kingdom) Billy MacKenzie	(Italy) Tony Cairoli	(United Kingdom) Billy MacKenzie
6	June 4	Bulgaria	Sevlievo	(Italy) Tony Cairoli	(Netherlands) Marc de Reuver	(Netherlands) Marc de Reuver
7	June 11	Italy	Montevarchi	(Italy) David Philippaerts	(Italy) David Philippaerts	(Italy) David Philippaerts
8	June 18	United Kingdom	Matterley Basin	(Italy) David Philippaerts	(Italy) Tony Cairoli	(Italy) David Philippaerts
9	July 2	Sweden	Uddevalla	(Italy) David Philippaerts	(France) Christophe Pourcel	(Italy) David Philippaerts
10	July 16	South Africa	Sun City	(Italy) David Philippaerts	(Italy) Tony Cairoli	(Italy) Tony Cairoli
11	July 30	Czech Republic	Loket	(South Africa) Tyla Rattray	(Italy) Tony Cairoli	(Italy) David Philippaerts
12	August 6	Belgium	Namur	(Italy) Tony Cairoli	(Italy) Tony Cairoli	(Italy) Tony Cairoli
13	August 27	Northern Ireland	Desertmartin	(South Africa) Tyla Rattray	(South Africa) Tyla Rattray	(South Africa) Tyla Rattray
14	September 3	Netherlands	Lierop	(Italy) Tony Cairoli	(France) Christophe Pourcel	(France) Christophe Pourcel
15	September 17	France	Ernee	(Italy) Tony Cairoli	(Italy) Tony Cairoli	(Italy) Tony Cairoli

=== Riders Championship ===
Pos	Rider	Bike	BEL (Belgium)		ESP (Spain)		POR (Portugal)		GER (Germany)		JPN (Japan)		BUL (Bulgaria)		ITA (Italy)		GBR (United Kingdom)		SWE (Sweden)		RSA (South Africa)		CZE (Czech Republic)		BEL (Belgium)		NIR (Northern Ireland)		NED (Netherlands)		FRA (France)		Points
1	(France) Christophe Pourcel	Kawasaki	7	4	4	7	2	2	1	1	2	5	2	4	4	3	2	12	3	1	10	4	6	2	3	2	3	4	3	1	2	4	581
2	(Italy) Tony Cairoli	Yamaha	15	2	Ret	1	1	10	5	7	4	1	1	Ret	2	2	6	1	2	12	3	1	11	1	1	1	2	7	1	3	1	1	563
3	(Italy) David Philippaerts	KTM	1	13	10	6	6	Ret	13	4	5	17	3	3	1	1	1	2	1	2	1	Ret	2	3	2	Ret	7	3	8	Ret	3	3	480
4	(South Africa) Tyla Rattray	KTM	3	1	5	2	3	1	4	3	6	Ret	5	2	5	Ret	17	15	5	21	2	2	1	Ret	17	4	1	1	2	2	7	6	475
5	(Netherlands) Marc de Reuver	KTM	4	3	3	5	4	5	2	2	3	2	6	1	9	Ret	Ret	17	4	5	Ret	Ret	9	4	5	13	8	2	Ret	Ret	8	2	408
6	(United Kingdom) Carl Nunn	KTM	8	10	7	12	5	8	12	11	12	6	11	7	14	12	11	9	11	7	5	3	3	5	11	3	13	Ret	9	5	4	5	377
7	(Portugal) Rui Gonçalves	KTM	13	5	23	4	9	Ret	17	9	13	9	19	6	11	6	12	5	9	Ret	12	6	12	14	8	7	4	8	6	4	10	7	325
8	(United Kingdom) Tommy Searle	Kawasaki	9	11	11	23	10	7	11	10	8	7	18	20	15	7	8	3	7	3	6	8	5	7	DNQ	DNQ	11	Ret	4	7	12	11	315
9	(United Kingdom) Billy MacKenzie	Yamaha	24	9	8	3	7	6	6	5	1	3	Ret	11	Ret	13	3	8	Ret	9	16	11	18	6	7	17	16	9	Ret	Ret	9	12	302
10	(France) Sebastien Pourcel	Kawasaki	5	8	6	Ret	Ret	13	Ret	Ret	10	14	4	5	3	5	10	4	22	10	8	7	16	8	4	5	5	5	Ret	Ret	14	Ret	298
11	(South Africa) Gareth Swanepoel	Kawasaki	16	25	21	11	11	9	9	15	7	4	9	19	6	4	7	Ret	6	4	4	10	7	9	Ret	6	9	6	13	Ret			286
12	(Italy) Alessio Chiodi	Yamaha	6	Ret	2	10	8	3	3	22	16	16			18	11	13	10	8	13	9	12	4	13	DNQ	DNQ					11	13	229
13	(Norway) Kenneth Gundersen	Yamaha	2	6	1	19	12	Ret	7	19	9	11	Ret	10	8	17	5	6	10	8	DNS	DNS	Ret	18	18	Ret	6	Ret	Ret	DNS	13	Ret	223
14	(Italy) Manuel Monni	KTM	18	Ret	18	16	17	18	16	13	18	13	12	8	12	Ret	15	11	Ret	11	11	5	14	10	9	9	12	14	DNQ	DNQ	Ret	8	196
15	(Estonia) Aigar Leok	Yamaha	14	15	DNQ	DNQ	Ret	Ret	8	14	Ret	8	14	Ret	10	Ret	Ret	DNS	12	Ret			19	19	14	8	10	11	5	6	17	14	160
16	(Italy) Davide Guarneri	Yamaha	11	12	Ret	8	Ret	15	Ret	6	Ret	10	8	18	7	Ret	4	Ret	Ret	6	7	9			Ret	Ret					Ret	Ret	153
17	(Finland) Matti Seistola	Honda	21	17	12	Ret	13	16	14	18			16	Ret	13	9	Ret	13	Ret	Ret			10	16	10	12	15	13	11	9	16	17	150
18	(France) Anthony Boissiere	Yamaha	DNQ	DNQ	16	18	14	12	10	16	11	26	10	16	DNQ	DNQ	14	7	DNQ	DNQ			21	Ret	16	15	DNQ	DNQ	20	14	Ret	15	112
19	(France) Pierre Renet	Honda	19	16	Ret	14	15	20	21	17			22	17	17	15	16	14	20	16			23	17	13	10	19	Ret	Ret	12	18	9	106
20	(Germany) Max Nagl	KTM	17	19	DNQ	DNQ	Ret	14	18	8	14	12											Ret	15	6	21	14	Ret	7	11	20	16	103
21	(Belgium) Patrick Caps	Honda	12	18	13	13	Ret	4	Ret	Ret							DNS	DNS					8	12	12	Ret	18	Ret	DNQ	DNQ	5	Ret	96
22	(France) Luigi Seguy	Yamaha	20	14	9	9	Ret	11	Ret	12	15	15	13	9	22	10															DNQ	DNQ	94
23	(France) Nicolas Aubin	KTM	DNQ	DNQ	24	15	16	17	Ret	Ret			7	Ret	DNQ	DNQ	9	23	13	15			DNS	DNS	DNQ	DNQ	20	Ret	21	16	6	10	87
24	(Spain) Carlos Campano	KTM	26	Ret	Ret	Ret	DNS	Ret	22	21			15	21	16	8	21	Ret	16	14			13	11	24	11	Ret	20	DNQ	DNQ	19	18	70
25	(Germany) Marcus Schiffer	KTM	25	21	14	Ret	18	Ret	24	Ret			17	12	19	19	DNQ	DNQ									22	10	12	8			60
26	(United Kingdom) Tom Church	Kawasaki											27	15	DNQ	DNQ	Ret	21	Ret	17	13	13	15	20	DNQ	DNQ	27	16	Ret	19	15	Ret	46
27	(United Kingdom) Jason Dougan	Honda	27	20	15	Ret	DNQ	DNQ	15	24					DNQ	DNQ	20	Ret	17	Ret	14	14	17	25	DNQ	DNQ							36
28	(France) Antoine Meo	Honda	10	7	19	Ret	Ret	DNS							Ret	18	DNQ	DNQ															30
29	(France) Xavier Boog	Yamaha	Ret	24	17	17							20	23	25	21	Ret	18	Ret	20			DNQ	DNQ	20	18	26	15	17	21	21	20	28
30	(Belgium) Dennis Verbruggen	Yamaha																					Ret	22	Ret	16	25	Ret	15	10	22	21	22
31	(Belgium) Joel Roelants	KTM																					DNQ	DNQ	22	Ret	17	17	10	Ret	DNQ	DNQ	19
32	(Slovakia) Martin Kohut	Honda			DNQ	DNQ	DNQ	DNQ	DNQ	DNQ			26	13	DNQ	DNQ	DNQ	DNQ	DNQ	DNQ			DNQ	DNQ			21	12			DNQ	DNQ	17
33	(United Kingdom) Shaun Simpson	Honda	22	23	DNQ	DNQ	21	22	DNQ	DNQ			25	14	23	23	19	19					Ret	21	15	Ret	DNQ	DNQ	DNQ	DNQ			17
34	(Sweden) Jonas Wing	KTM	DNQ	DNQ	Ret	22	19	Ret	20	20			DNQ	DNQ	20	20	Ret	20	15	18			DNQ	DNQ	27	20	24	Ret	Ret	DNS			17
35	(Netherlands) Rob van Vijfeijken	Yamaha																											14	13			15
36	(Italy) Matteo Bonini	Yamaha	DNQ	DNQ											DNQ	DNQ	DNQ	DNQ	21	22			Ret	23	25	14	23	21	Ret	Ret	23	19	9
37	(Finland) Eero Remes	Honda							DNQ	DNQ									14	19													9
38	(Italy) Fabio Mossini	Suzuki	DNQ	DNQ	DNQ	DNQ	DNQ	DNQ	19	Ret			DNQ	DNQ	Ret	14	DNQ	DNQ	Ret	Ret			Ret	Ret	DNQ	DNQ					DNQ	DNQ	9
39	(South Africa) Sacha Naude	Yamaha																			18	15											9
40	(Sweden) Johan Carlsson	Yamaha	DNQ	DNQ	DNQ	DNQ	23	21	DNQ	DNQ			DNQ	DNQ	24	22	DNQ	DNQ	DNQ	DNQ							DNQ	DNQ	19	15	DNQ	DNQ	8
41	(Italy) Angelo Pellegrini	Suzuki	DNQ	DNQ	DNQ	DNQ	DNQ	DNQ	DNQ	DNQ			24	22	26	16	DNQ	DNQ	18	Ret			DNQ	DNQ	DNQ	DNQ							8
42	(Netherlands) Nick Tuin	Yamaha																											18	17			7
43	(France) Jeremy Tarroux	Kawasaki	Ret	DNS											27	Ret	DNQ	22	19	Ret			20	Ret	19	Ret	28	19	DNQ	DNQ	Ret	Ret	7
44	(South Africa) Michael Kok	Suzuki																			15	Ret											6
45	(United Kingdom) Wayne Smith	Honda	23	22													DNQ	DNQ											16	20			6
46	(South Africa) Ross Branch	Kawasaki																			Ret	16											5
47	(United Kingdom) Brad Anderson	Yamaha															Ret	16															5
48	(Spain) Xavier Hernandez	Yamaha			20	20	20	19																									5
49	(South Africa) Shaun Kruger	KTM																			22	17											4
50	(South Africa) Kerim Fitz-Gerald	Yamaha																			17	Ret											4
51	(Japan) Yohei Kojima	Suzuki									17	21																					4
52	(Japan) Manabu Watanabe	Yamaha									20	18																					4
53	(South Africa) Freddie Fourie	KTM																			19	19											4
54	(France) Gregory Aranda	Kawasaki	DNQ	26	24	24	22	Ret	DNQ	DNQ			DNQ	DNQ	DNQ	DNQ	DNQ	DNQ	Ret	Ret							DNQ	DNQ	DNQ	18	DNQ	DNQ	3
55	(United Kingdom) Martin Barr	Yamaha																							DNQ	DNQ	Ret	18			DNQ	DNQ	3
56	(South Africa) Johannes de Bruin	Yamaha																			21	18											3
57	(United Kingdom) Ray Rowson	Kawasaki															18	Ret															3
58	(Japan) Yuya Ozaki	Yamaha									19	20																					3
59	(Austria) Matthias Walkner	KTM													DNQ	DNQ									23	19			DNQ	DNQ	DNQ	DNQ	2
60	(Japan) Kouichi Fukaya	Honda									23	19																					2
61	(South Africa) Darryl Fitz-Gerald	Yamaha																			Ret	20											1
62	(South Africa) Shaun Ford	Yamaha																			20	Ret											1
	(France) Remy Annelot	Honda	DNQ	DNQ	22	21	DNQ	DNQ	DNQ	DNQ			21	Ret	DNQ	DNQ	Ret	Ret	DNQ	DNQ			24	24	DNQ	DNQ							0
	(France) Loic Leonce	Yamaha	DNQ	DNQ	DNQ	DNQ	DNQ	DNQ	DNQ	DNQ			23	24	21	24	DNQ	DNQ	DNQ	DNQ			DNQ	DNQ	DNQ	DNQ			DNQ	DNQ	DNQ	DNQ	0
	(South Africa) Brandon Wheeler	KTM																			23	21											0
	(Japan) Yutaka Hoshino	Suzuki									21	27																					0
	(Belgium) Jeremy Van Horebeek	KTM																							21	Ret							0
	(Japan) Takuya Fukata	Yamaha									22	22																					0
	(South Africa) Angelo Picoto	Yamaha																			24	22											0
	(Italy) Roberto Lombrici	KTM	DNQ	DNQ					DNQ	DNQ					DNQ	DNQ							DNQ	DNQ	DNQ	DNQ			DNQ	DNQ	25	22	0
	(Belgium) Dennis Dierckx	Honda																							26	22							0
	(Spain) Francisco Jose Millan	KTM	Ret	Ret	DNQ	DNQ	DNQ	DNQ	DNQ	DNQ			Ret	Ret	DNQ	DNQ	22	Ret	DNQ	DNQ			DNQ	DNQ	DNQ	DNQ	DNQ	DNQ					0
	(France) Steven Frossard	KTM																					22	Ret	DNQ	DNQ					Ret	Ret	0
	(Japan) Takanori Nakajima	Yamaha									24	23																					0
	(South Africa) Louis Lazarus	KTM																			26	23											0
	(France) Florent Richier	Kawasaki							23	Ret																							0
	(France) Antoine Letellier	Kawasaki							Ret	23																							0
	(South Africa) Adam Scribante	Honda																			25	24											0
	(Japan) Yuui Hoshino	Honda									26	24																					0
	(France) Marvin Musquin	Kawasaki																													24	Ret	0
	(Japan) Yuta Ikegaya	Yamaha									25	25																					0
	(Zimbabwe) Sacha Mitchell	KTM																			DNS	25											0
	(Netherlands) George Strik	KTM	DNQ	DNQ																									Ret	Ret			0
	(Japan) Kenki Sakashita	Yamaha									Ret	DNS																					0
	(Japan) Takeshi Katsuya	Honda									Ret	DNS																					0
	(Netherlands) Bram van Oosterbosch	KTM																									DNQ	DNQ	DNQ	Ret			0
	(South Africa) Lloyd Vercueil	Yamaha																			DNS	DNS											0
	(Denmark) Nikolaj Larsen	KTM	DNQ	DNQ	DNQ	DNQ	DNQ	DNQ	DNQ	DNQ			DNQ	DNQ	DNQ	DNQ	DNQ	DNQ	DNQ	DNQ			DNQ	DNQ	DNQ	DNQ	DNQ	DNQ	DNQ	DNQ	DNQ	DNQ	0
	(United Kingdom) Elliott Banks-Browne	Honda	DNQ	DNQ	DNQ	DNQ	DNQ	DNQ					DNQ	DNQ	DNQ	DNQ	DNQ	DNQ	DNQ	DNQ					DNQ	DNQ	DNQ	DNQ					0
	(United Kingdom) Scott Probert	Honda	DNQ	DNQ	DNQ	DNQ	DNQ	DNQ	DNQ	DNQ					DNQ	DNQ	DNQ	DNQ					DNQ	DNQ	DNQ	DNQ	DNQ	DNQ					0
	(Denmark) Kenneth Nielsen	KTM	DNQ	DNQ	DNQ	DNQ	DNQ	DNQ	DNQ	DNQ			DNQ	DNQ	DNQ	DNQ	DNQ	DNQ															0
	(United Kingdom) Jake Nicholls	Suzuki															DNQ	DNQ	DNQ	DNQ							DNQ	DNQ					0
	(Spain) Jose Butron	Yamaha																					DNQ	DNQ	DNQ	DNQ	DNQ	DNQ					0
	(Italy) Daniel Boscolo	KTM	DNQ	DNQ	DNQ	DNQ																											0
	(United Kingdom) Steven Clarke	Honda															DNQ	DNQ													DNQ	DNQ	0
	(Austria) Günter Schmidinger	Honda																					DNQ	DNQ	DNQ	DNQ							0
	(France) Johan Marillier	KTM																					DNQ	DNQ							DNQ	DNQ	0
	(Italy) Deny Philippaerts	Yamaha																									DNQ	DNQ	DNQ	DNQ			0
	(France) Gautier Paulin	Honda																									DNQ	DNQ			DNQ	DNQ	0
	(South Africa) Shannon Terreblance	KTM																											DNQ	DNQ	DNQ	DNQ	0
	(Spain) Estanis Manuel	KTM	DNQ	DNQ																													0
	(Denmark) Kasper Jensen	Yamaha			DNQ	DNQ																											0
	(Spain) Pol Panes	Yamaha			DNQ	DNQ																											0
	(Spain) Carmelo Gutierrez	Honda			DNQ	DNQ																											0
	(Panama) Miguel Villoldo	Honda			DNQ	DNQ																											0
	(Portugal) Paulo Alberto	Honda					DNQ	DNQ																									0
	(Portugal) Nelson Silva	Yamaha					DNQ	DNQ																									0
	(Germany) Stephan Mock	Suzuki							DNQ	DNQ																							0
	(Germany) Tim Münchofen	Honda							DNQ	DNQ																							0
	(Germany) Robert Sturm	Suzuki							DNQ	DNQ																							0
	(Netherlands) Mike Kras	Suzuki							DNQ	DNQ																							0
	(Belarus) Evgeni Tyletski	KTM							DNQ	DNQ																							0
	(Greece) Michalis Panagiotopoulos	KTM											DNQ	DNQ																			0
	(Bulgaria) Rosen Tonchev	KTM											DNQ	DNQ																			0
	(Bulgaria) Alexander Georgiev	Honda											DNQ	DNQ																			0
	(Bulgaria) Ivan Hristov	Honda											DNQ	DNQ																			0
	(Italy) Giordani Manzoni	Yamaha													DNQ	DNQ																	0
	(United Kingdom) Kristian Whatley	Honda															DNQ	DNQ															0
	(Sweden) Daniel Thom	Honda																	DNQ	DNQ													0
	(Sweden) Kristoffer Kallies	Suzuki																	DNQ	DNQ													0
	(Sweden) Marcus Ericsson	KTM																	DNQ	DNQ													0
	(Sweden) Robert Carlsson	Yamaha																	DNQ	DNQ													0
	(Sweden) Niclas Olsson	Honda																	DNQ	DNQ													0
	(Namibia) Brannigan Wise	KTM																			DNQ	DNQ											0
	(Zimbabwe) Sean Mitchell	KTM																			DNQ	DNQ											0
	(Zambia) Graham Lionnet	Honda																			DNQ	DNQ											0
	(Zambia) Warren Lionnet	Honda																			DNQ	DNQ											0
	(Kenya) Doungu Smith	Yamaha																			DNQ	DNQ											0
	(Czech Republic) Filip Neugebauer	Kawasaki																					DNQ	DNQ									0
	(Austria) Markus Mauser	KTM																					DNQ	DNQ									0
	(Czech Republic) Jiri Jankovsky	KTM																					DNQ	DNQ									0
	(France) Mike Valade	Yamaha																							DNQ	DNQ							0
	(Austria) Andreas Schmidinger	KTM																							DNQ	DNQ							0
	(United Kingdom) Wayne Garrett	KTM																									DNQ	DNQ					0
	(Republic of Ireland) Stuart Edmonds	TM																									DNQ	DNQ					0
	(United Kingdom) Jason Garrett	Honda																									DNQ	DNQ					0
	(United Kingdom) Phillip Mclaughin	Yamaha																									DNQ	DNQ					0
	(Netherlands) Ceriel Klein Kromhof	Honda																											DNQ	DNQ			0
	(Netherlands) Herjan Brakke	Honda																											DNQ	DNQ			0
	(France) Khounsith Vongsana	Yamaha																													DNQ	DNQ	0
	(France) Maxime Lesage	Honda																													DNQ	DNQ	0
	(France) Loic Rombaut	Kawasaki																													DNQ	DNQ	0
	(Sweden) Fredrik Karlsson	Yamaha																													DNQ	DNQ	0
Pos	Rider	Bike	BEL (Belgium)		ESP (Spain)		POR (Portugal)		GER (Germany)		JPN (Japan)		BUL (Bulgaria)		ITA (Italy)		GBR (United Kingdom)		SWE (Sweden)		RSA (South Africa)		CZE (Czech Republic)		BEL (Belgium)		NIR (Northern Ireland)		NED (Netherlands)		FRA (France)		Points

== MX3 ==
=== Calendar and Results ===
Round	Date	Grand Prix	Location	Race 1 Winner	Race 2 Winner	Round Winner
MX3
1	April 2	France	Castelnau-de-Lévis	(France) Yves Demaria	(France) Yves Demaria	(France) Yves Demaria
2	April 9	Spain	Talavera de la Reina	(France) Yves Demaria	(Italy) Enrico Oddenino	(France) Yves Demaria
3	April 23	Italy	Cingoli	(Italy) Christian Beggi	(France) Yves Demaria	(France) Yves Demaria
4	May 7	Hungary	Nyiregyhaza	(Belgium) Sven Breugelmans	(Belgium) Sven Breugelmans	(Belgium) Sven Breugelmans
5	May 21	Germany	Reutlingen	(Switzerland) Marc Ristori	(France) Yves Demaria	(Switzerland) Marc Ristori
6	May 25	Netherlands	Rhenen	(Belgium) Sven Breugelmans	(Belgium) Sven Breugelmans	(Belgium) Sven Breugelmans
7	June 4	Sweden	Tomelilla	(France) Yves Demaria	(France) Yves Demaria	(France) Yves Demaria
8	June 11	Croatia	Mladina	(Belgium) Sven Breugelmans	(France) Yves Demaria	(France) Yves Demaria
9	June 18	Slovenia	Orehova vas	(Belgium) Sven Breugelmans	(France) Yves Demaria	(France) Yves Demaria
10	July 2	Netherlands	Markelo	(Italy) Christian Beggi	(Italy) Christian Beggi	(Italy) Christian Beggi
11	July 9	Italy	Faenza	(Italy) Christian Beggi	(Italy) Christian Beggi	(Italy) Christian Beggi
12	July 23	Latvia	Kegums	(Italy) Christian Beggi	(Belgium) Sven Breugelmans	(Italy) Christian Beggi
13	July 30	Bulgaria	Samokov	(Italy) Enrico Oddenino	(Italy) Christian Beggi	(Italy) Enrico Oddenino
14	September 3	Switzerland	Roggenburg	(Switzerland) Marc Ristori	(Switzerland) Marc Ristori	(Switzerland) Marc Ristori

=== Riders Championship ===
Pos	Rider	Bike	Points
1	(France) Yves Demaria	KTM	562
2	(Belgium) Sven Breugelmans	KTM	549
3	(Italy) Christian Beggi	Honda	450
4	(Switzerland) Marc Ristori	Honda	437
5	(Italy) Enrico Oddenino	Honda	378
6	(Czech Republic) Martin Zerava	Honda	302
7	(Czech Republic) Jan Zaremba	KTM	285
8	(Slovenia) Saso Kragelj	Yamaha	279
9	(Czech Republic) David Cadek	KTM	260
10	(Belgium) Vincent Collet	Suzuki	225
11	(Italy) Daniele Bricca	Honda	176
12	(Czech Republic) Michal Kadlecek	Yamaha	173
13	(Croatia) Nenad Sipek	Yamaha	172
14	(Austria) Michael Staufer	KTM	124
15	(United States) Bader Manneh	KTM	122
16	(Belgium) Frédéric Weigert	Yamaha	67
17	(Austria) Oswald Reisinger	Honda	62
18	(Italy) Christian Stevanini	Suzuki	61
19	(France) Christophe Martin	KTM	56
20	(Finland) Niko Kalatie	KTM	53
21	(Netherlands) William Saris	Yamaha	53
22	(Belgium) Jurgen van Nooten	KTM	52
23	(Finland) Jussi Nikkila	Yamaha	51
24	(Slovenia) Miha Spindler	Honda	49
25	(Austria) Mario Hirschmugl	KTM	44
26	(Netherlands) Mike Kras	Suzuki	43
27	(Italy) Matteo Aperio	Honda	42
28	(Italy) Thomas Traversini	KTM	39
29	(Switzerland) Matthieu Doutaz	Honda	36
30	(France) Julien Vanni	Honda	35
31	(Italy) Andrea Bartolini	Yamaha	34
32	(Italy) Felice Compagnone	KTM	34
33	(Sweden) Frederik Petterson	KTM	30
34	(Italy) Fabio Ferrari	KTM	30
35	(Italy) Stefano Dami	Yamaha	30
36	(Sweden) Mats Nilsson	Yamaha	28
37	(Hungary) Laszlo Czuni	Honda	28
38	(Czech Republic) Petr Bartos	Suzuki	27
39	(Germany) Dennis Schröter	Suzuki	25
40	(Netherlands) Jarno Verhorevoort	Honda	25
41	(Denmark) Tonni Andersen	Suzuki	25
42	(Ukraine) Roman Morozov	Suzuki	24
43	(Czech Republic) Vitezslav Marek	KTM	24
44	(Italy) Alessandro Cinelli	Honda	23
45	(Bulgaria) Nikolay Kumanov	Yamaha	23
46	(Sweden) Joachim Eliasson	KTM	22
47	(Netherlands) Erwin Plekkenpol	KTM	22
48	(Belgium) Kenny van Herck	Yamaha	20
49	(Austria) Kurt Machtlinger	Honda	18
50	(France) Maxime Emery	Kawasaki	17
51	(Switzerland) Patrick Walther	Honda	17
52	(Netherlands) Mark Wassink	KTM	17
53	(Croatia) Danijel Bozic	KTM	17
54	(Netherlands) Anne Advokaat	Honda	16
55	(Sweden) Michael Andersson	Honda	16
56	(Netherlands) Erik David	KTM	16
57	(Latvia) Martins Alexandrovics	Yamaha	16
58	(Russia) Alexander Ivanutin	Yamaha	16
59	(Slovenia) Roman Jelen	Suzuki	16
60	(Netherlands) Oscar Vromans	Yamaha	14
61	(Estonia) Jaanus Koval	Honda	14
62	(Slovenia) Jaka Moze	Honda	13
63	(Latvia) Nils Sroms	Yamaha	13
64	(Switzerland) Bruno Rufli	KTM	13
65	(Netherlands) Heikki van den Berg	Honda	12
66	(Hungary) Balazs Deczi	Suzuki	12
67	(United Kingdom) Ben Lambert-Williams	Yamaha	12
68	(France) Jean-Patrick Andreo	Yamaha	11
69	(Netherlands) Hans Vogels	Yamaha	10
70	(Estonia) Henri Remma	Kawasaki	9
71	(France) Matthieu Ambeis	Yamaha	9
72	(Netherlands) Jimmy Kaal	Suzuki	9
73	(Italy) Alex Varadi	Honda	9
74	(Italy) Filippo Debbi	Honda	9
75	(San Marino) Matteo Zecchin	Suzuki	9
76	(Germany) Andre Prehn	KTM	8
77	(Bulgaria) Andrey Asenov	KTM	8
78	(Czech Republic) Miroslav Kucirek	Honda	7
79	(France) Arnaud Demeester	Yamaha	6
80	(France) Jerome Hemery	Yamaha	6
81	(Russia) Dmitry Parshin	Suzuki	6
82	(Croatia) Nicolas Bogicevic	Husqvarna	6
83	(Switzerland) Alan Boechat	TM	6
84	(Austria) Christoph Lackner	Yamaha	6
85	(United Kingdom) Glen Philipps	Yamaha	5
86	(Netherlands) Tom Hemmelder	Kawasaki	5
87	(Sweden) Nicklas Granstrom	Yamaha	5
88	(Italy) Danilo Montagni	Honda	5
89	(United Kingdom) Ed Bradley	Yamaha	4
90	(Sweden) Patrick Olsson	KTM	4
91	(Switzerland) Gregory Wicht	Yamaha	4
92	(Lithuania) Domas Grundele	Yamaha	4
93	(Sweden) Jonas Bodin	Yamaha	3
94	(France) Fabien Couderc	Honda	3
95	(Belgium) Bric Schelfaut	Yamaha	3
96	(United Kingdom) Sydney Bales	Honda	3
97	(Germany) Dario Gianni Dapor	Honda	2
98	(Sweden) Henrik Isgren	Honda	2
99	(Belgium) Sven Wouters	Suzuki	2
100	(France) Sebastien Trottier	Honda	2
101	(Italy) Luca Andreani	Honda	1
102	(Switzerland) Guillaume Flandin	Husqvarna	1
