= Christian Beggi =

Italian motorcycle racer (born 1978)

Christian Beggi (born 1 November 1978 in Scandiano) is an Italian Grand Prix motocross racer.

Beggi began his professional career in 2002. In 2004, he finished second to Yves Demaria in the F.I.M. MX3-GP world championship. He finished third in 2006. After being injured during the 2007 season, he came back to finish second to Sven Breugelmans in the 2008 MX3-GP world championship.
