= Ecklund =

Ecklund is a surname. Notable people with the surname include:

- Brad Ecklund (1922–2010), center in the AAFC and in the National Football League
- Daryl Ecklund (born 1985), American motocross rider
- Elaine Howard Ecklund, Autrey Professor of Sociology at Rice University
- Peter Ecklund (born 1945), American jazz cornetist
