= Ancillotti =

Ancillotti may refer to:

- Ancillotti (motorbike)
- Ancillotti (band), Italian heavy metal band
- Mario Ancillotti, Italian flutist
- Bruno Ancillotti, Italian rugby player for SS Lazio Rugby 1927
