= Swedish Motocross Championship =

Premier domestic Swedish Motocross series

- Swedish Motocross Championship logo
- Category: Motocross
- Country: Sweden
- Inaugural season: 1951

The Swedish Motocross Championship (Swedish: Svenska Mästerskapen i Motocross abbreviated to MXSM) is the premier domestic Swedish Motocross series, sanctioned by the Svenska Motorcykel- och Snöskoterförbundet.

The series runs annually throughout the spring and summer months. The premier classes are MX1 and MX2, which are supported at each round by classes for junior, youth and women riders.

== History ==
The Swedish Motocross Championship has existed since 1951. As the country was at the forefront of the sport in its early days, international stars such as Bill Nilsson, Rolf Tibblin and Torsten Hallman took multiple titles. World Champions such as Håkan Andersson, Håkan Carlqvist and Marcus Hansson also experienced periods of dominance within their respective classes. During the 1950s and 1960s, the Swedish Motocross Championship was considered almost as challenging as the Motocross World Championship.

Mats Nilsson and Filip Bengtsson are the joint most successful riders, with eight national titles apiece.

The classes within the championship have evolved over time, in line with what has been seen in the sport around the world.

== Event Format ==
Rounds of the Swedish Motocross Championship typically have a two day format. The first day will see qualifying sessions and the first main race, with the remaining two main races happening on the second day.

From the 2026 season, points are awarded to all starters of the main races, in the following format:

Place	1	2	3	4	5	6	7	8	9	10	11	12	13	14	15	16	17	18	19	20	21	22	23	24	25	26	27	28	29	30	31	32	33	34	35	36	37	38	39	40
	45	42	40	38	36	35	34	33	32	31	30	29	28	27	26	25	24	23	22	21	20	19	18	17	16	15	14	13	12	11	10	9	8	7	6	5	4	3	2	1

== Broadcast ==
The comprehensive broadcast of each round of the Swedish Motocross Championship is currently via a live stream on the MXSM official YouTube channel. In addition to this, the series is currently broadcast on FIM-Moto.tv, the official platform of the FIM.

== List of Champions ==
Season	MX1 Champion	MX2 Champion	MX3 Champion
2026	(Sweden) Alvin Östlund (Triumph)	(Sweden) Alve Callemo (Husqvarna)	-
2025	(Sweden) Anton Gole (Yamaha)	(Denmark) Magnus Smith (KTM)	-
2024	(Sweden) Ken Bengtson (KTM)	(Sweden) Filip Bengtsson (KTM)	-
2023	(Sweden) Anton Gole (Husqvarna)	(Sweden) Filip Bengtsson (KTM)	-
2022	(Sweden) Danne Karlsson (Husqvarna)	(Sweden) Albin Gerhardsson (Husqvarna)	-
2021	(Sweden) Anton Gole (Husqvarna)	(Sweden) Ken Bengtson (Husqvarna)	-
2020	(Sweden) Filip Bengtsson (Husqvarna)	(Sweden) Ken Bengtson (Husqvarna)	-
2019	(Sweden) Filip Bengtsson (Husqvarna)	(Sweden) Pontus Jönsson (Husqvarna)	-
2018	(Sweden) Filip Bengtsson (Yamaha)	(Sweden) Ken Bengtson (Husqvarna)	-
2017	(Denmark) Nikolaj Larsen (KTM)	(Sweden) Anton Gole (Husqvarna)	-
2016	(Sweden) Jesper Jönsson (Husqvarna)	(Norway) Even Heibye (KTM)	-
2015	(Sweden) Jesper Jönsson (Husqvarna)	(Sweden) Alvin Östlund (Yamaha)	-
2014	(Sweden) Filip Bengtsson (KTM)	(Norway) Even Heibye (KTM)	-
2013	(Sweden) Filip Bengtsson (KTM)	(Norway) Even Heibye (KTM)	-
2012	(Sweden) Filip Thuresson (Honda)	(Sweden) Kalle Olsson (Honda)	-
2011	(Sweden) Tom Söderström (Suzuki)	(Sweden) Filip Bengtsson (KTM)	-
2010	(Sweden) Marcus Norlen (Honda)	(Sweden) Fredrik Norén (Honda)	-
2009	(Norway) Kenneth Gundersen (Yamaha)	(Sweden) Filip Thuresson (Suzuki)	-
2008	(Sweden) Mats Nilsson (Yamaha)	(Sweden) Filip Thuresson (Suzuki)	(Sweden) Mats Nilsson (Yamaha)
2007	(Sweden) Kalle Karlsson (Yamaha)	(Sweden) Mats Nilsson (Yamaha)	(Sweden) Mats Nilsson (Yamaha)
2006	(Sweden) Mats Nilsson (Yamaha)	(Norway) Kenneth Gundersen (Yamaha)	(Sweden) Mats Nilsson (Yamaha)
2005	(Sweden) Karl Karlsson (Suzuki)	(Sweden) Jonas Wing (KTM)	(Sweden) Jonny Lindhe (KTM)
2004	(Sweden) Joakim Karlsson (Yamaha)	(Sweden) Stefan Andersson (Yamaha)	(Sweden) Jonny Lindhe (Honda)
	250cc Champion	125cc Champion	500cc Champion
2003	(Sweden) Tommy Engwall (Suzuki)	(Sweden) Stefan Andersson (Yamaha)	(Sweden) Joakim Karlsson (Husaberg)
2002	(Sweden) Petri Järvelä (Kawasaki)	(Sweden) Stefan Andersson (Yamaha)	(Sweden) Jonas Edberg (KTM)
2001	(Sweden) Karl Karlsson (Honda)	(Sweden) Petri Järvelä (Honda)	(Sweden) Jonte Engdahl (KTM)
	250/500cc Champion		
2000	(Sweden) Peter Johansson (KTM)	(Sweden) Petri Järvelä (Honda)	-
1999	(Sweden) Peter Johansson (KTM)	(Sweden) Fredrik Werner (Husqvarna)	-
1998	(Sweden) Mats Nilsson	(Sweden) Ola Eifrém	-
1997	(Sweden) Peter Johansson (Yamaha)	(Sweden) Joakim Wahnström (Yamaha)	-
1996	(Sweden) Peter Johansson (Husqvarna)	(Sweden) Mats Nilsson	-
1995	(Sweden) Jonte Engdahl	(Sweden) Ola Eifrém (Kawasaki)	-
1994	(Sweden) Marcus Hansson (Honda)	(Sweden) Fredrik Werner (Husqvarna)	-
1993	(Sweden) Peter Johansson (Yamaha)	(Sweden) Joakim Karlsson (Suzuki)	-
1992	(Sweden) Marcus Hansson (Kawasaki)	(Sweden) Joakim Karlsson (Kawasaki)	-
	250cc Champion	125cc Champion	500cc Champion
1991	(Sweden) Jörgen Nilsson (Honda)	(Sweden) Joakim Karlsson (Kawasaki)	(Sweden) Stefan Larsson (Kawasaki)
1990	(Sweden) Marcus Hansson (Kawasaki)	(Sweden) Joakim Karlsson (Kawasaki)	(Sweden) Stefan Larsson (Kawasaki)
1989	(Sweden) Peter Johansson (Yamaha)	(Sweden) Lars Andersson (Honda)	(Sweden) Stefan Larsson (Kawasaki)
1988	(Sweden) Jörgen Nilsson	(Sweden) Dick Pettersson (Yamaha)	(Sweden) Stefan Larsson (Kawasaki)
1987	(Sweden) Peter Hansson (KTM)	(Sweden) Bjarne Thörnblom	(Sweden) Leif Persson (Yamaha)
1986	(Sweden) Anders Eriksson (Yamaha)	(Sweden) Dick Pettersson (Kawasaki)	(Sweden) Leif Persson (Yamaha)
1985	(Sweden) Anders Eriksson (Yamaha)	(Sweden) Ari Sairanen (Yamaha)	(Sweden) Leif Persson (Yamaha)
1984	(Sweden) Anders Eriksson (Yamaha)	(Sweden) Jörgen Gustafsson (Suzuki)	(Sweden) Conny Carlsson (Yamaha)
1983	(Sweden) Jörgen Nilsson (Yamaha)	(Sweden) Kenneth Johansson (Yamaha)	(Sweden) Håkan Carlqvist (Yamaha)
1982	(Sweden) Torleif Hansen (Yamaha)	(Sweden) Jeff Nilsson (Kawasaki)	(Sweden) Håkan Carlqvist (Yamaha)
1981	(Sweden) Leif Niklasson	(Sweden) Jeff Nilsson (Yamaha)	(Sweden) Håkan Carlqvist (Yamaha)
1980	(Sweden) Rolf Wicksell (Husqvarna)	(Sweden) Jeff Nilsson (Yamaha)	(Sweden) Håkan Carlqvist (Yamaha)
1979	(Sweden) Håkan Carlqvist (Husqvarna)	(Sweden) Christer Nyström (Simonini)	(Sweden) Håkan Andersson (Husqvarna)
1978	(Sweden) Torleif Hansen (Kawasaki)	-	(Sweden) Håkan Andersson (Husqvarna)
1977	(Sweden) Torleif Hansen (Kawasaki)	(Sweden) Jonny Bjurström (Suzuki)	(Sweden) Håkan Andersson (Montesa)
1976	(Sweden) Torleif Hansen (Kawasaki)	(Sweden) Per-Ake Hansson (Ancillotti)	(Sweden) Åke Jonsson (Maico)
1975	(Sweden) Torleif Hansen (Kawasaki)	(Sweden) Tommy Olsson (Ancillotti)	(Sweden) Åke Jonsson (Yamaha)
1974	(Sweden) Håkan Andersson (Yamaha)	(Sweden) Torbjörn Winzell (Husqvarna)	(Sweden) Arne Kring (Husqvarna)
1973	(Sweden) Torleif Hansen (Kawasaki)	(Sweden) Bengt Arne Bonn (Yamaha)	(Sweden) Åke Jonsson (Yamaha)
1972	(Sweden) Håkan Andersson (Yamaha)	-	(Sweden) Åke Jonsson (Maico)
1971	(Sweden) Håkan Andersson (Husqvarna)	-	(Sweden) Christer Hammargren (Husqvarna)
1970	(Sweden) Uno Palm (Husqvarna)	-	(Sweden) Bengt Åberg (Husqvarna)
1969	(Sweden) Bengt Arne Bonn (Husqvarna)	-	(Sweden) Christer Hammargren (Husqvarna)
1968	(Sweden) Bengt Arne Bonn (Husqvarna)	-	(Sweden) Åke Jonsson (Husqvarna)
1967	(Sweden) Olle Pettersson (Husqvarna)	-	(Sweden) Åke Jonsson (Husqvarna)
1966	(Sweden) Olle Pettersson (Husqvarna)	-	(Sweden) Jan Johansson (Lindström)
1965	(Sweden) Torsten Hallman (Husqvarna)	-	(Sweden) Rolf Tibblin (ČZ)
1964	(Sweden) Åke Jonsson (Husqvarna)	-	(Sweden) Rolf Tibblin (Hedlund)
1963	(Sweden) Torsten Hallman (Husqvarna)	-	(Sweden) Rolf Tibblin (Husqvarna)
1962	(Sweden) Torsten Hallman (Husqvarna)	-	(Sweden) Rolf Tibblin (Husqvarna)
1961	(Sweden) Torsten Hallman (Husqvarna)	-	(Sweden) Sten Lundin (Lito)
1960	(Sweden) Sivert Eriksson (Husqvarna)	-	(Sweden) Bill Nilsson (Husqvarna)
1959	(Sweden) Rolf Tibblin (Husqvarna)	-	(Sweden) Bill Nilsson (Crescent)
1958	(Sweden) Ove Lundell (Monark)	-	(Sweden) Sten Lundin (Monark)
1957	-	-	(Sweden) Bill Nilsson (AJS)
1956	-	-	(Sweden) Gunnar Johansson (BSA)
1955	-	-	(Sweden) Sten Lundin (BSA)
1954	-	-	(Sweden) Bill Nilsson (BSA)
1953	-	-	(Sweden) Kuno Johansson (BSA)
1952	-	-	(Sweden) Ove Malmqvist (Triumph)
1951	-	-	(Sweden) Eric Ericsson
