= Peter Johansson (motorcyclist) =

Swedish motocross rider (born 1966)

- Nationality: Swedish

Motocross career
- Years active: 1982, 1985-2002
- Teams: Yamaha, KTM
- Wins: 9

Peter Johansson (born 11 January 1966) is a Swedish former professional Grand Prix motocross racer. He competed in the Motocross World Championships between 1982 and 2002.

Johansson finished third in the F.I.M. 500cc motocross world championship three times, in 1996, 1998 and 2000. In 1999, he finished in second place behind Andrea Bartolini. Johansson retired after the 2000 season.

Johansson won 13 individual heat races and nine Grand Prix victories during his world championship racing career. He was the 1999 500cc Class Vice Champion and won six Swedish Motocross Championships (1989, 1993, 1996–1997, 1999–2000). Johansson was a member of 13 Swedish Motocross des Nations teams (1987–1992, 1994–1998, 2000–2001).
