= Tony Cairoli =

Italian motorcycle racer

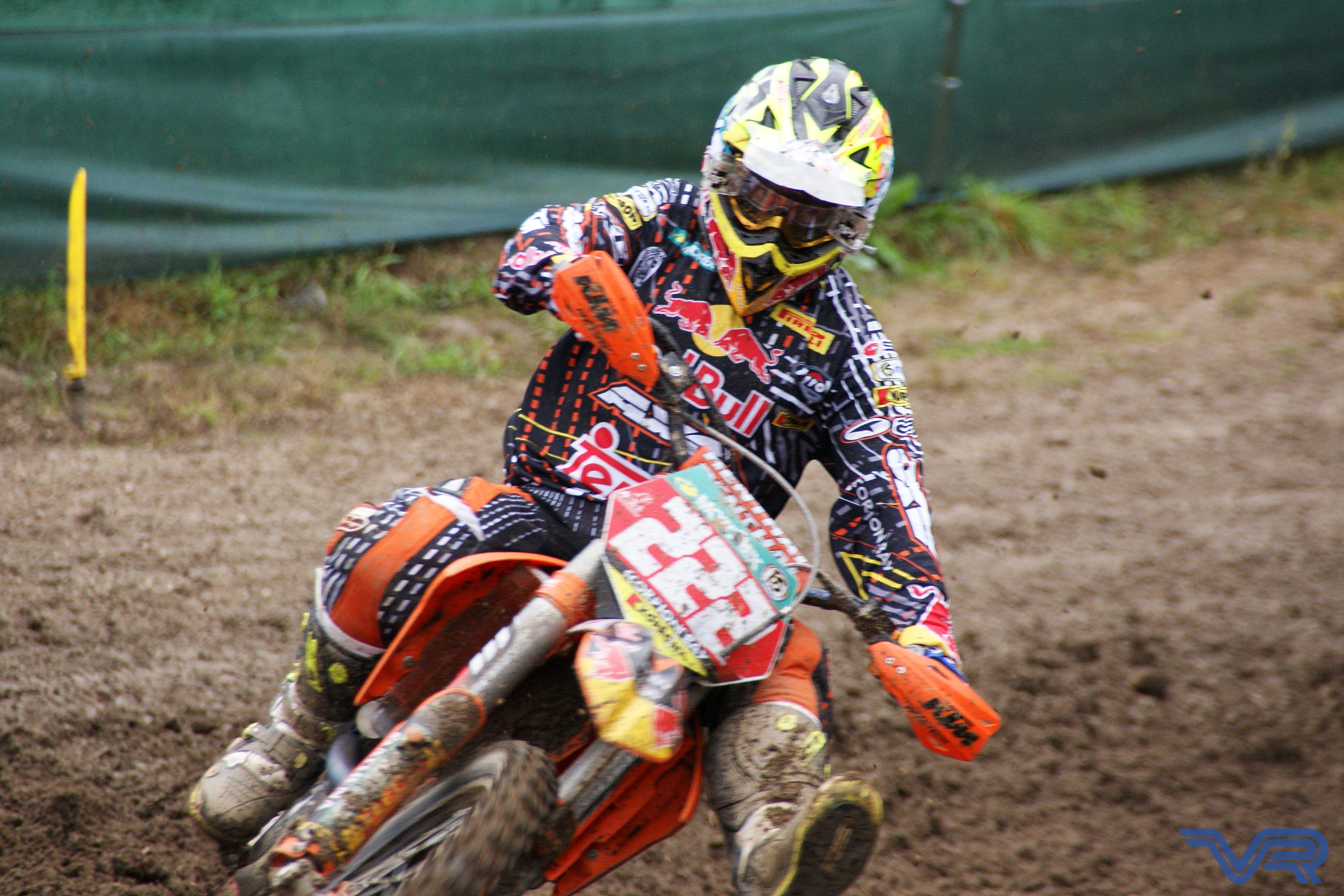
- Cairoli in 2011
- Nationality: Italian
- Born: 23 September 1985 (age 41) Patti, Sicily, Italy

Motocross career
- Years active: 2002–2022
- Teams: •Yamaha Red Bull De Carli Racing Team (2004-2009); •Red Bull KTM De Carli Racing Team (2010-2022); •Ducati (2023-Present)
- Grands Prix: 277 (69 MX2, 208 MXGP)
- Championships: •2005 MX2; •2007 MX2; •2009 MXGP; •2010 MXGP; •2011 MXGP; •2012 MXGP; •2013 MXGP; •2014 MXGP; •2017 MXGP
- Wins: •MX2: 24; •MXGP: 70; •Total: 94
- GP debut: 2002, GP of Belgium, 125cc
- First GP win: 2004, GP of Wallonia MX2

Antonio "Tony" Cairoli (born 23 September 1985) is an Italian professional motocross racer. He competed in the Motocross World Championships from 2002 to 2021. Cairoli is notable for winning nine FIM Motocross World Championships. He was also a member of the winning Italian team at the 2021 Motocross des Nations. He currently works as part of the development team for the Ducati brand.

== Life and MXGP Career ==
Antonio was born in Patti, Sicily. He began his motocross Grand Prix career in 2002 riding a Yamaha. He and his wife Jill Cox split their time between Rome, Italy and Lommel, Belgium, where he trained.

=== 2004 ===
In his debut MX2 season, Cairoli rode to a third-place finish in the championship with a maiden GP win at round 12.

=== 2005 ===
Cairoli won his first of two MX2 titles in 2005 with six wins and nine podiums.

=== 2006 ===
Cairoli ended 2006 second in the MX2 World Championship.

=== 2007 ===
Cairoli dominated the MX2 field in 2007, securing ten wins from 15 Grand Prix's (missed round 14) as well as 13 out of 14 podium finishes. This led him to his second MX2 World Motocross Championship.

=== 2008 ===
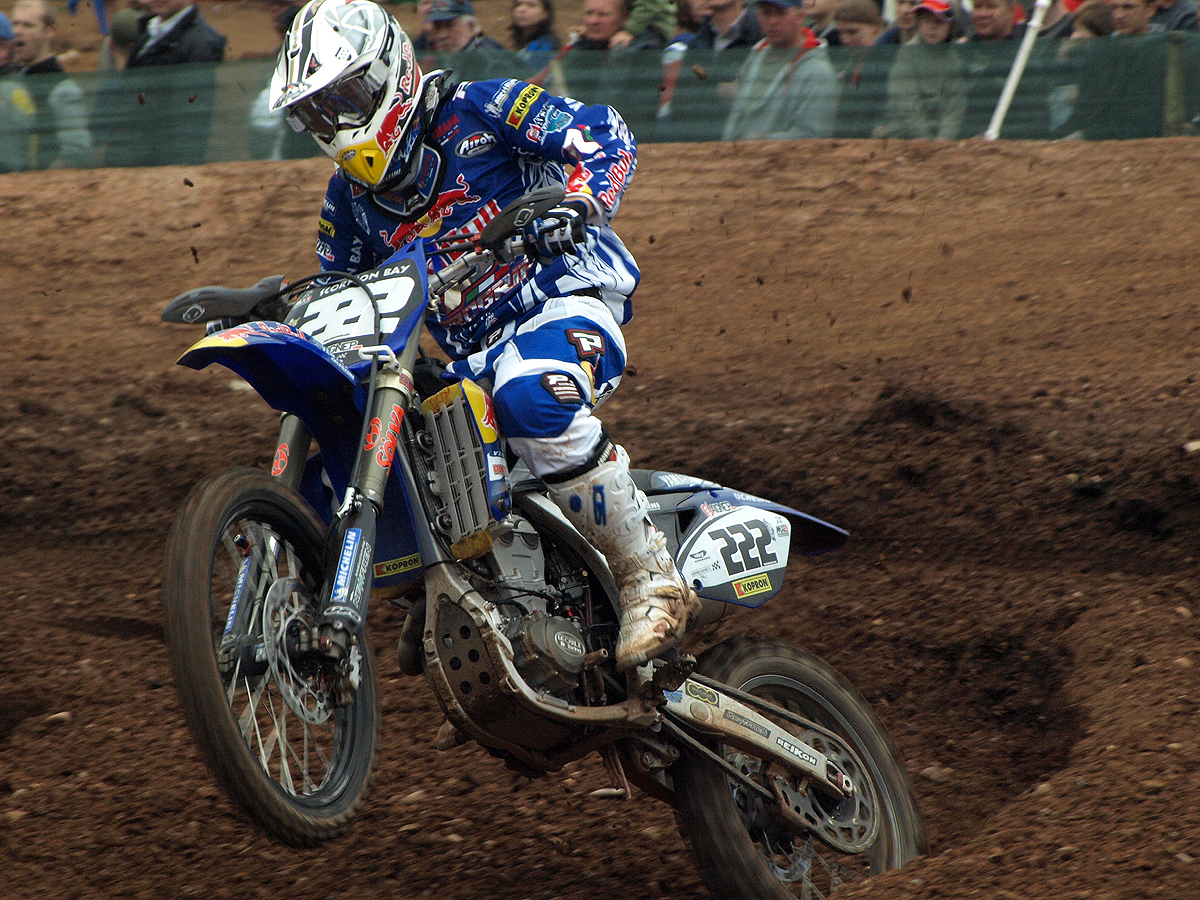
Cairoli in 2008 at the GP of England

Cairoli was unable to defend his MX2 championship, mainly due to missing five rounds because of injury.

=== 2009 ===
Cairoli claimed the 2009 FIM Motocross World Championship, on his last year at Yamaha. This was his first premier class title. He ended the season with four GP wins.

=== 2010 ===
Cairoli successfully defended his MX1 world championship in 2010. Riding for the Red Bull Factory KTM team, as well as being the first since Stefan Everts in 2006 to defend the MX1 championship. He added another eight GP wins to his record.

=== 2011 ===
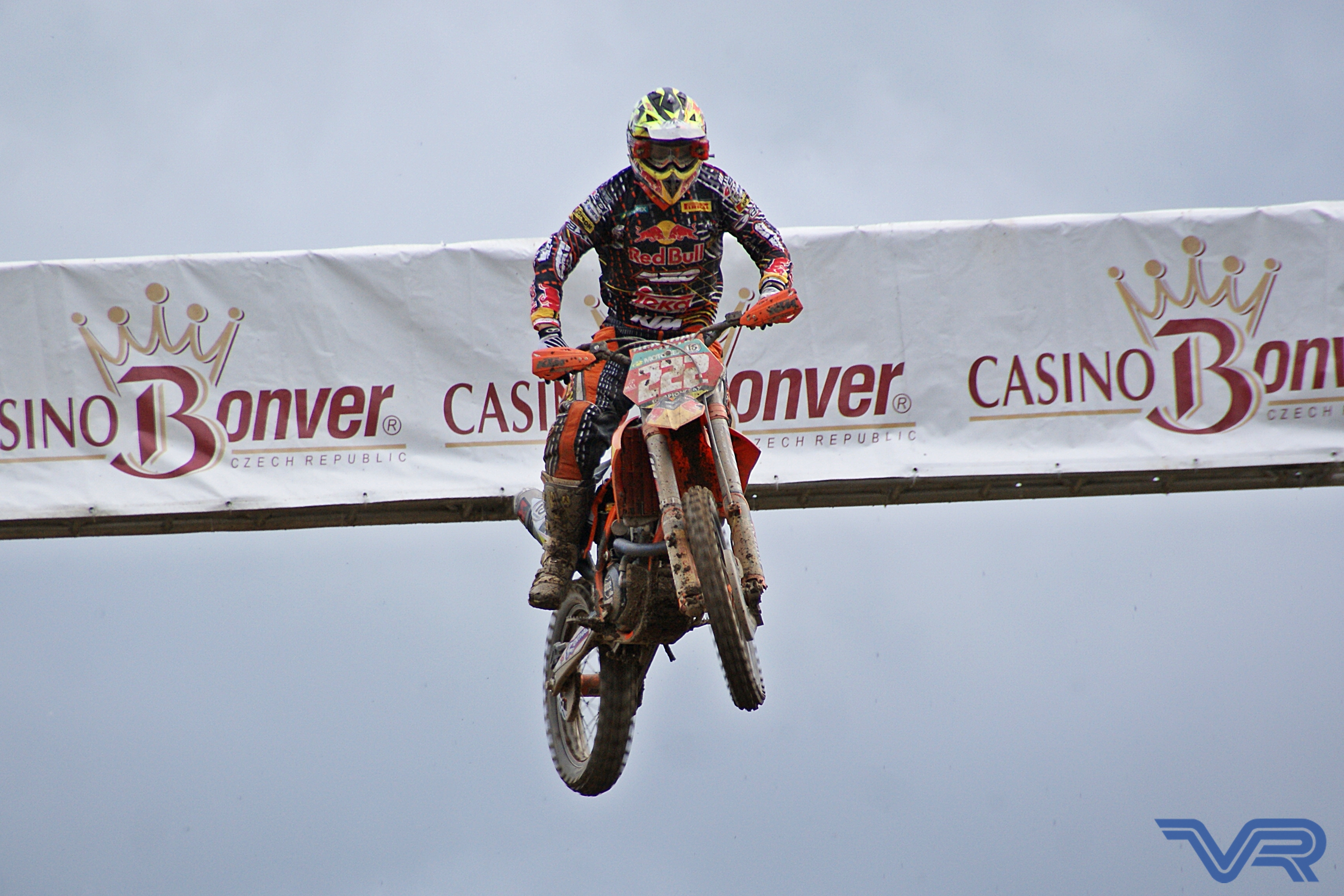
Tony Cairoli at the GP of Loket in 2011

Cairoli won his third consecutive MX1 title in 2011 with six Grand Prix victories.

=== 2012 ===
On 5 August 2012, in Czech Republic, Cairoli won his 50th GP in the MX1 World Championship. He defended the MX1 title for the fourth time. He ended the season with 11 GP wins from the 15 rounds he raced.

=== 2013 ===
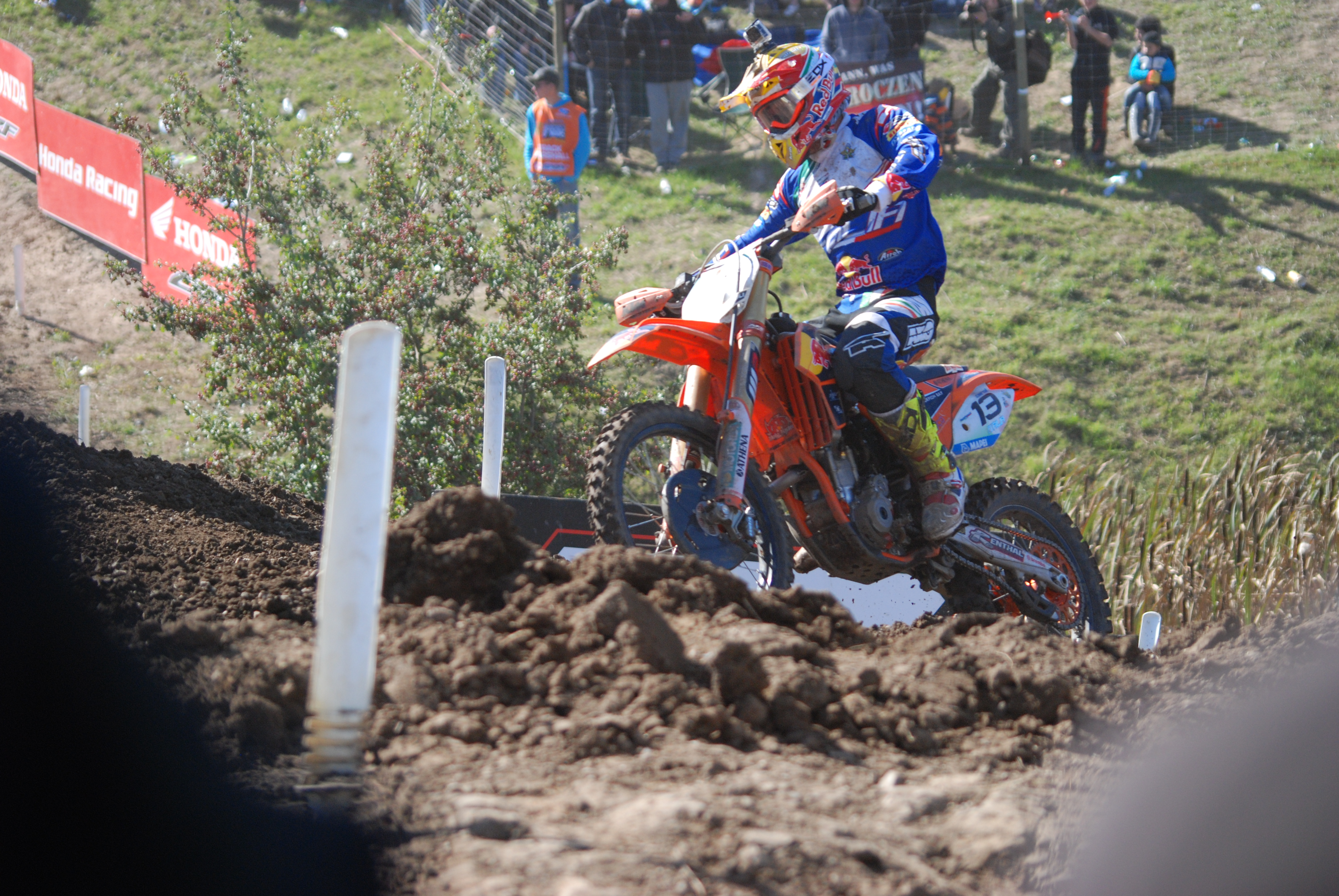
Cairoli at the 2013 Motocross des Nations

In the 2013 MX1 season, Cairoli continued his dominance in the Motocross World Championship. Riding for the Red Bull KTM Factory Racing team, Cairoli displayed exceptional skill and consistency. He secured multiple victories throughout the season and defended the MX1 World Championship title for the fifth time, further solidifying his status as one of the premier riders in motocross.

=== 2014 ===
In the 2014 MXGP season, Cairoli continued his remarkable performance in the premier class of the Motocross World Championship. He showcased consistent excellence, securing multiple victories and podium finishes. Despite facing tough competition, Cairoli's skill and determination prevailed, and he successfully defended his title, winning the MXGP World Championship for another consecutive year.

=== 2015 ===
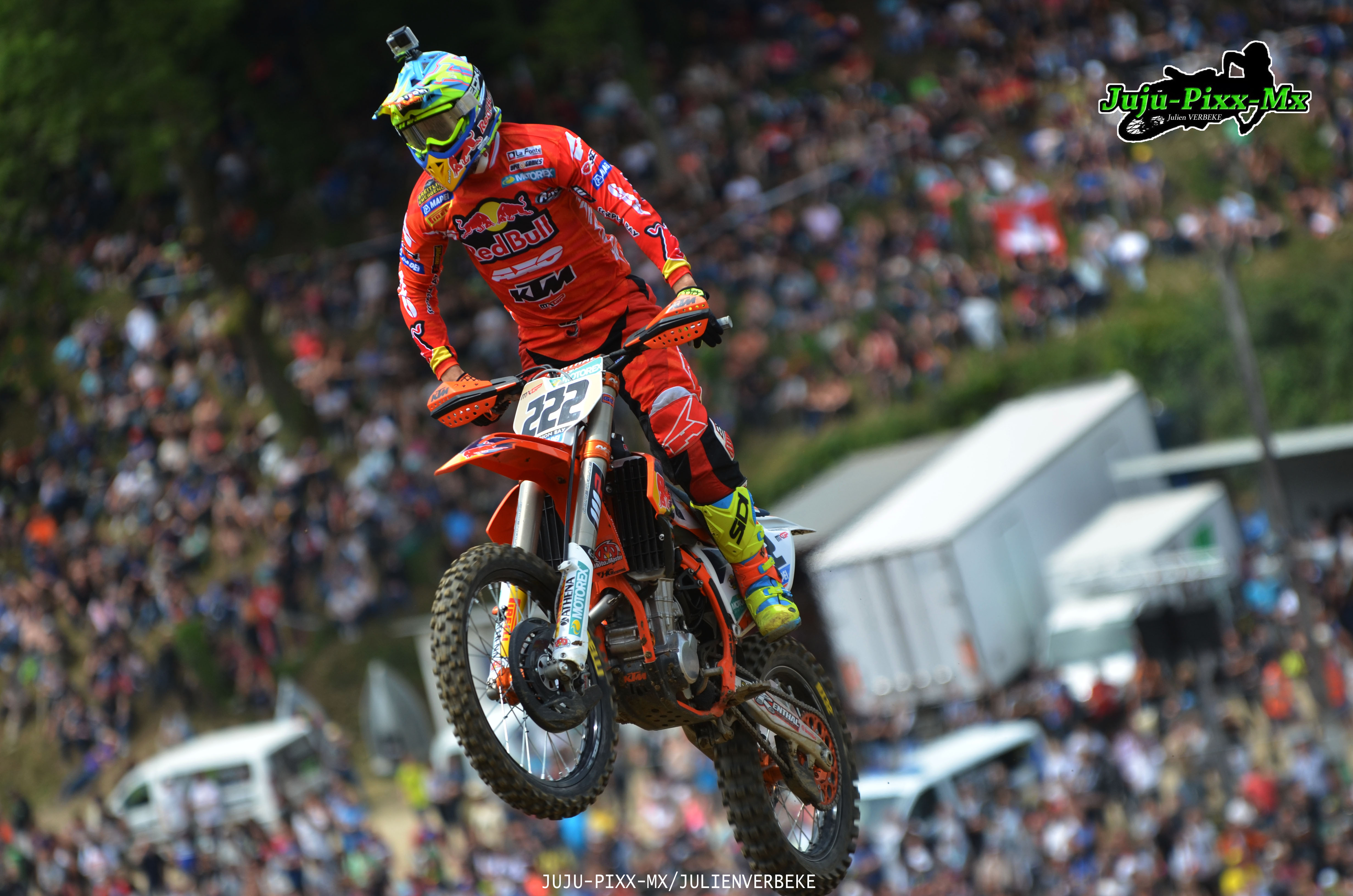
Cairoli at the MXGP of France in 2015

Cairoli's streak of six MXGP World Championships came to an end due to injury. He ended the season seventh.

=== 2016 ===
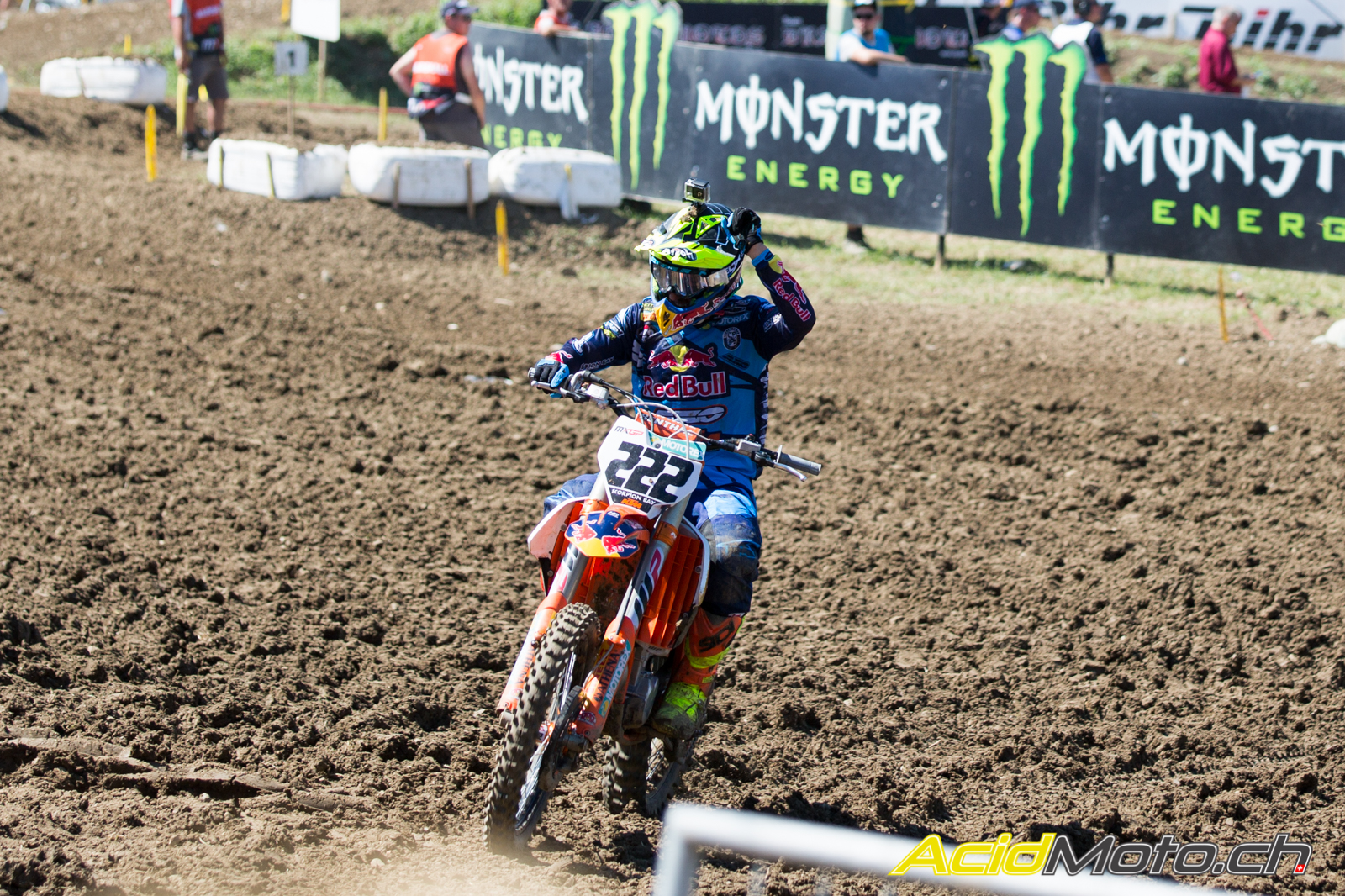
Cairoli in 2016 at the MXGP of Switzerland

Coming off an injury sustained in 2015, Cairoli battled to a second place championship finish.

=== 2017 ===
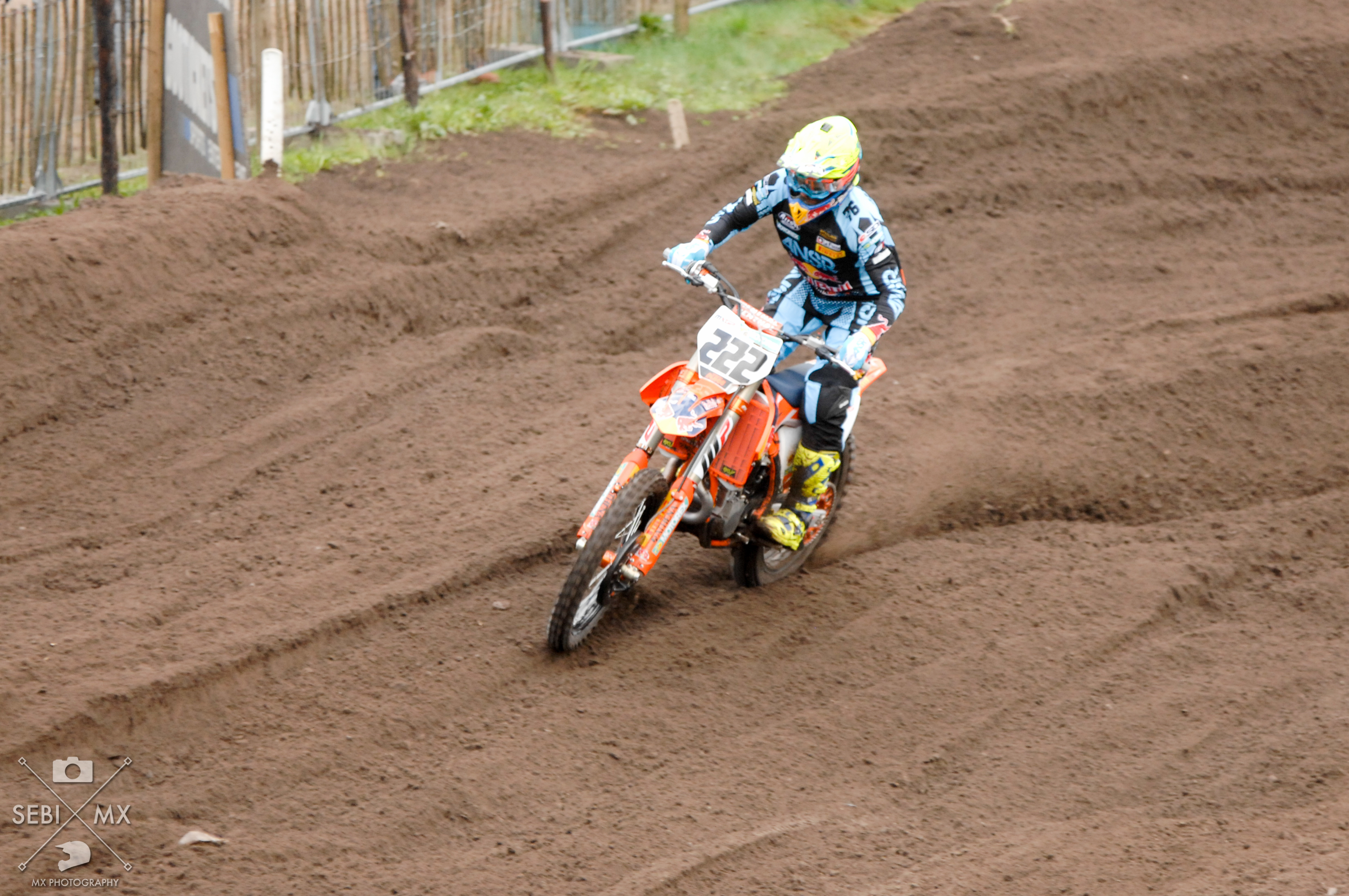
Cairoli at the GP of Valkenswaard, 2017

At the age of 32, 2017 was the year in which Cairoli was able to clinch his ninth MXGP World Championship, with six Grand Prix wins.

=== 2021 ===
Cairoli announced his retirement from motocross on September 14, 2021.

=== 2022 ===
After his retirement from full-time professional racing, Cairoli announced he would be visiting the United States to race the AMA Motocross Championship for select rounds which included Fox Raceway, Hangtown, Thunder Valley, High Point & Budds Creek. His best result was a fifth at Thunder Valley.

=== 2024 ===
Celebrating his comeback and Ducati's debut at the motocross world championship, Cairoli raced at the MXGP of Arnhem (Qualifying: seventh, Race 1: 15th).

== Achievements ==
Year	Motorcycle	World Championship						MdN			Italian Ch.	Supercross		Títles
Year	Motorcycle	MXGP	MX1	MX2	Titles	GP wins	Races wins	Race1	Race2	Nation's Overall	Italian Ch.	European Ch.	British Ch.	Títles
2001	?										1st Cadet			1
2002	Honda										1st Junior			1
2003	Honda													-
2004	Yamaha			3rd	–	1	1	18th	26th	15th				-
2005	Yamaha			1st	MX2	6	12	39th	36th	13th				1
2006	Yamaha			2nd	–	3	11	10th	1st	4th	1st	1st		2
2007	Yamaha		24th	1st	MX2	11	23	37th	14th	4th	1st	1st	1st	4
2008	Yamaha			6th	–	4	8	–	–	–				-
2009	Yamaha		1st		MX1	4	9	1st	38th	6th				1
2010	KTM		1st		MX1	8	15	2nd	4th	5th				1
2011	KTM		1st		MX1	6	9	40th	37th	16th				1
2012	KTM		1st		MX1	11	21	1st	1st	5th				1
2013	KTM		1st		MX1	9	20	1st	1st	3rd				1
2014	KTM	1st			MXGP	9	15	40th	19th	6th				1
2015	KTM	7th			–	2	5	-	-	-				-
2016	KTM	2nd			–	3	5	2nd	2nd	5th				-
2017	KTM	1st			MXGP	6	9	11th	7th	7th				1
2018	KTM	2nd			-	2	6	6th	4th	2nd				-
2019	KTM	10th				4	7			16th				-
2020	KTM	3rd				3	2	21st	2nd	1st				-
Total titles		2	5	2	9	85	169	3	3	0	2	2	1	16
		9 world titles												

== Post Racing Career ==
After his full time racing career ended, Cairoli took up the role of team manager of the Red Bull KTM Factory team and oversaw their efforts in both MX2 and MXGP.

Cairoli left KTM in 2023. He later revealed he had joined the new Ducati motocross program. In his role, Cairoli will report directly to Ducati Corse director Paolo Ciabatti and assist in the development of Ducati's motocross bikes and the efforts of both MXGP and AMA riders under the Ducati banner, with the first Ducati motocross motorcycles being ready to race in 2025. He raced the Ducati Desmo450 in two rounds of the 2026 AMA pro motocross series.

== MXGP Career Results ==
Year	Rnd 1	Rnd 2	Rnd 3	Rnd 4	Rnd 5	Rnd 6	Rnd 7	Rnd 8	Rnd 9	Rnd 10	Rnd 11	Rnd 12	Rnd 13	Rnd 14	Rnd 15	Rnd 16	Rnd 17	Rnd 18	Rnd 19	Rnd 20	Average Finish	Podium Percent	Place
2004 MX2	8	5	5	5	3	OUT	5	4	13	7	3	1	4	2	3	-	-	-	-	-	4.85	36%	3rd
2005 MX2	5	2	1	6	7	2	20	1	OUT	1	3	1	1	1	11	5	10	-	-	-	4.81	56%	1st
2006 MX2	7	8	3	5	2	6	2	2	1	6	4	1	3	2	1	-	-	-	-	-	3.53	60%	2nd
2007 MX2	1	1	1	1	1	2	1	1	1	2	2	8	1	OUT	1	-	-	-	-	-	1.71	93%	1st
2008 MX2	2	4	1	7	1	1	10	2	1	DNF	OUT	OUT	OUT	OUT	OUT	-	-	-	-	-	3.22	67%	6th
2009 MX1	5	6	1	2	1	3	8	3	1	1	2	3	4	6	9	-	-	-	-	-	3.60	60%	1st
2010 MX1	2	1	1	2	4	1	2	4	2	1	1	1	1	1	DNF	-	-	-	-	-	1.71	86%	1st
2011 MX1	9	1	5	2	2	2	1	3	2	1	1	2	1	1	OUT	-	-	-	-	-	2.35	86%	1st
2012 MX1	1	3	2	1	8	1	3	1	DNF	1	1	1	1	1	1	1	-	-	-	-	1.80	93%	1st
2013 MX1	2	1	1	1	2	2	1	1	3	1	1	1	1	1	5	2	7	3	-	-	2.00	89%	1st
2014 MXGP	3	1	1	5	1	1	4	1	3	1	5	1	1	3	1	3	3	-	-	-	2.23	82%	1st
2015 MXGP	4	3	3	2	11	1	1	3	13	9	7	5	OUT	OUT	OUT	OUT	OUT	OUT	-	-	6.89	50%	7th
2016 MXGP	5	5	4	2	6	2	1	1	7	4	6	4	7	3	1	2	14	2	-	-	4.22	44%	2nd
2017 MXGP	1	4	7	2	1	4	2	1	2	5	1	1	1	2	3	7	3	4	15	-	3.47	63%	1st
2018 MXGP	2	2	1	3	2	3	2	6	2	2	1	2	4	2	2	7	4	8	2	OUT	3.00	74%	2nd
2019 MXGP	1	1	1	2	2	7	1	8	11	OUT	OUT	OUT	OUT	OUT	OUT	OUT	OUT	OUT	-	-	3.78	67%	10th
2020 MXGP	3	4	13	1	4	3	4	1	8	4	2	6	9	3	5	1	5	12	-	-	4.89	39%	3rd
2021 MXGP	10	1	3	2	2	5	5	5	3	OUT	7	5	5	DNS	1	5	3	15	-	-	4.81	44%	6th

== Injuries ==
- 2008 – Torn Acl (Knee, MXGP of South Africa)
- 2014 – Knee injury (at MXON Kegums, Latvia)
- 2015 – Fractured elbow (MXGP of Maggiora, Italy)
- 2016 – two broken ribs, wrist injury
- 2019 - Shoulder injury

Sporting positions
Preceded by Ben Townley	Motocross World Championship; MX2 Champion; 2005	Succeeded by Christophe Pourcel
Preceded by Christophe Pourcel	Motocross World Championship; MX2 Champion; 2007	Succeeded by Tyla Rattray
Preceded by David Philippaerts	Motocross World Championship; MX1/MXGP Champion; 2009–2014	Succeeded by Romain Febvre
Preceded by Tim Gajser	Motocross World Championship; MXGP Champion; 2017	Succeeded by Jeffrey Herlings
