= Sébastien Tortelli =

French motorcycle racer (born 1978)

- Nationality: French
- Born: 19 August 1978 (age 48) Agen, France

Motocross career
- Years active: 1994–2006
- Teams: Kawasaki, Honda, Suzuki, KTM
- Championships: 125cc - 1996 250cc - 1998
- Wins: 20

Sébastien Tortelli (born 19 August 1978) is a French former professional motocross and supercross racer. He competed in the Motocross World Championships from 1994 to 1998 and, competed in the AMA Motocross Championships from 1999 to 2005. He returned to Europe to compete in the 2006 FIM Motocross World Championship for his final season of professional motocross. Tortelli is notable for winning two FIM motocross world championships. He was one of the few competitors who could beat both Stefan Everts and Ricky Carmichael in their prime.

== World championship career ==
Tortelli was born in Agen, France where his parents were farmers. He began riding on the family farm when he was 4 1/2 years old. Tortelli made his world championship debut at the last 125cc Grand Prix of the 1994 season, just few days after his 16th birthday. He joined the Jan DeGroot-Kawasaki factory racing team for the 1995 season, winning his first world championship race at the 1995 125cc Indonesian Grand Prix and, finished the season ranked third in the final championship overall results behind Alessandro Puzar and Alessio Chiodi.

Tortelli won the 1996 125cc motocross world championship in a dominating manner by winning 11 out of 12 Grand Prix races and became the youngest-ever motocross world champion at the time. He moved up to the 250cc world championship in the 1997 season and won two Grand Prix races to end the season ranked fourth in the championship.

Tortelli competed in his first American motocross competition at the opening round of the 1998 AMA Supercross season in the Los Angeles Coliseum as a relatively unknown competitor to American spectators. In one of the biggest surprises in AMA Supercross history, Tortelli won the race held in muddy conditions against top AMA competitors such as Jeremy McGrath and Jeff Emig. The victory marked the only supercross victory of Tortelli's career.

The 1998 250cc world championship season was notable for the remarkable battle between Tortelli and the defending three-time 250cc champion Stefan Everts that, wasn't decided until the final round of the series. The two riders dominated the season with Everts winning eight rounds while Tortelli won seven rounds out of the 16 race season. Tortelli won the final Grand Prix of the season to win the 250cc motocross world championship.

== AMA career ==
Tortelli moved to the United States in 1999 and joined the Honda factory racing team to compete in the AMA Motocross Championships. Although he was a talented motocross racer, he had little supercross experience and had a steep learning curve. After a 12th-place finish in the 1999 Supercross season, he began the outdoor 250cc MX national championship season with a stunning victory at the season opener held at the Glen Helen Raceway. After becoming involved in a first lap crash, Tortelli recovered to pass the entire field en route to a first moto victory. The same scenario repeated itself in the second moto as Tortelli was involved in another crash before coming back for another victory. He was leading the series after the first six rounds but, he crashed and broke his wrist at the Unadilla round.

Tortelli began the 2000 SX season strongly but, once again suffered an injury and eventually finished the 250cc SX season in second place behind McGrath. He won two motos in the first two rounds of the 2001 250cc MX national championship to once again claim an early season lead in the series but, eventually finished the year ranked sixth as Ricky Carmichael dominated the season.

Tortelli raced for Team Suzuki from 2003 through the 2005 season, and suffered knee and wrist injuries that made him unable to complete an entire season. During his seven-year tenure in AMA competition, Tortelli won four AMA Nationals and finished in the top five 54 times however, numerous injuries prevented him from further success.

== Return to Europe ==
Tortelli signed a contract with KTM to compete in the 2006 MX1 class for 450cc motorcycles. He had a contract clause that guaranteed him a return to the AMA series if he could win the FIM MX1 title. He showed surprising speed at the opening round in Belgium when, he traded moto wins with Everts. However, at the third round of the series, he dislocated his hip at the Portuguese Grand Prix and had to drop out of the 2006 Grand Prix season. He announced his retirement from professional motocross in December 2006 at the age of 28.

== Post-racing career ==
After retiring from competition, Tortelli managed Perris Raceway in Perris, California with former motocross racer Ricky Johnson as a partner. He later started Champ Factory in Temecula, California, a training school for young motocross racers.

As of November 2021, Tortelli lists himself as Stark Future Test Director.
