= Ancillotti (band) =

Italian metal band

Ancillotti is an Italian heavy metal band. They have released three albums, all through Pure Steel Records.

It is described as a "family project" created by Daniele "Bud" Ancillotti, formerly of Strana Officina and Bud Tribe, with his brother Alessandro "Bid" Ancillotti playing the bass, and Bid's son Brian on drums.

== Discography ==
- Down This Road Together (EP, 2012)
- The Chain Goes On (2014)
- Strike Back (2016)
- Hell on Earth (2020)
