= Torleif Hansen =

Swedish motocross rider

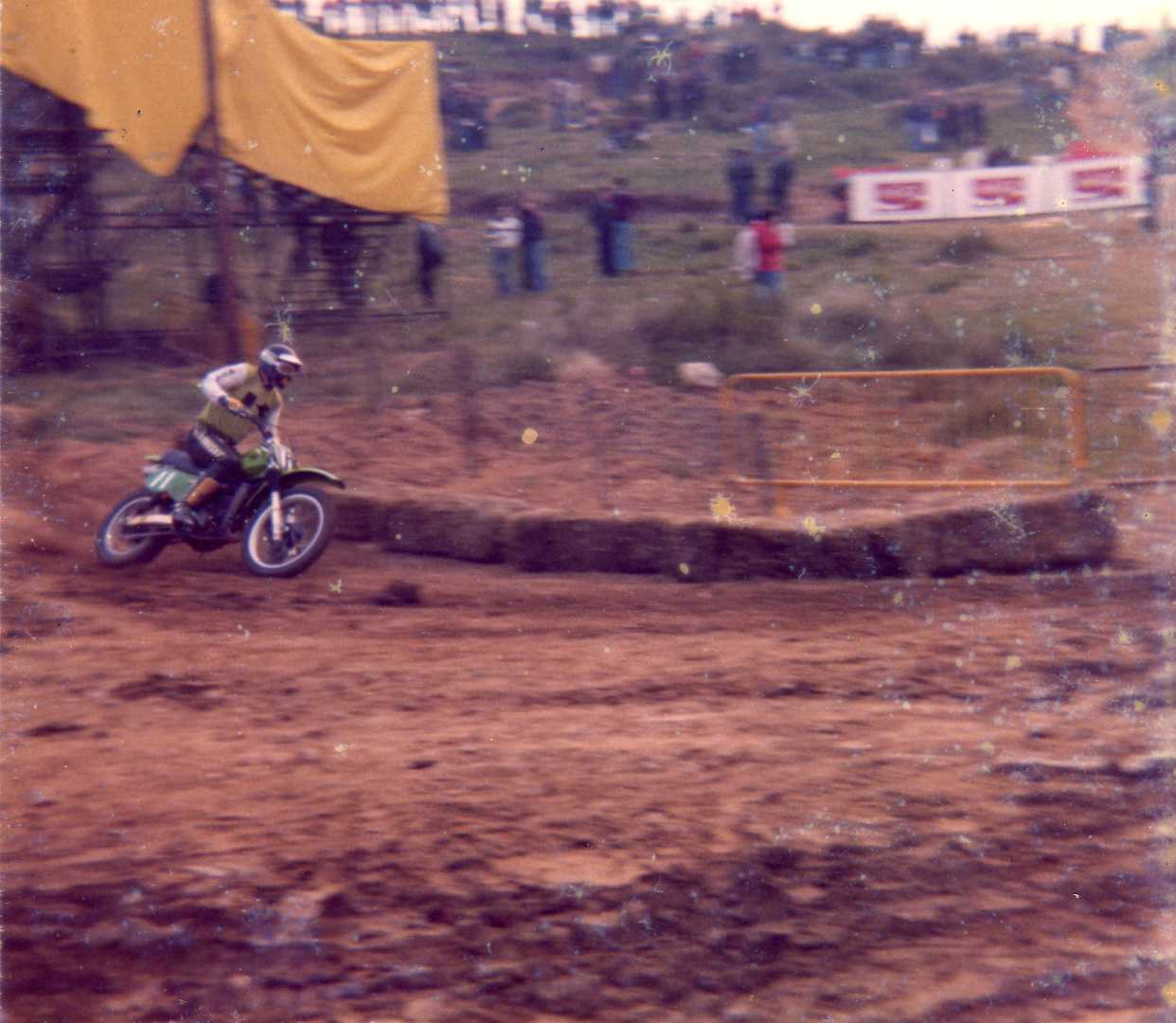
- Torleif Hansen at the 1978 Spanish Grand Prix
- Nationality: Swedish
- Born: 5 October 1948 (age 77) Upplands Väsby, Sweden

Motocross career
- Years active: 1968 - 1983
- Teams: Husqvarna, Kawasaki, Yamaha
- Wins: 12

Torleif Hansen (born 5 October 1948) is a Swedish former professional motocross racer. He competed in the FIM Motocross World Championships from 1968 to 1983, most prominently as a member of the Kawasaki factory racing team.

== Biography ==
Hansen was born on 5 October 1948 in Upplands Väsby, Sweden. He idolized World Champion Torsten Hallman and began racing motorcycles at the age of 16. At the age of 20, Hansen scored in his first Motocross World Championship points with a fifth-place finish at the 1968 250cc Austrian Grand Prix riding a Husqvarna motorcycle. He suffered a broken leg while racing which forced him to miss the entire 1969 season. In just the third Grand Prix race of his career, the 21-year-old Hansen scored a surprising victory at the 1970 250cc French Grand Prix.

After the 1971 World Championships, Hansen traveled to the United States to compete in the 1971 Trans-AMA motocross series. The Trans-AMA series was an international series established by the American Motorcyclist Association as a pilot event to help establish motocross in the United States. He finished the series ranked third overall behind the overall winner Sylvain Geboers (Suzuki) and Adolf Weil (Maico).

In 1974, Hansen won three 250cc Grand Prix races, but failed to score points in over half of the races and finished the season ranked fourth in the World Championship. He won two Grand Prix races during the 1976 250cc Motocross World Championship, putting himself in second place behind the points leader Heikki Mikkola (Husqvarna) when he suffered an injury that forced out of contention. He would finish fifth in the final points standings.

Hansen had his best season in 1978 as a member of the Kawasaki factory racing team when he won five Grand Prix races and finished second to Gennady Moiseyev in the 250cc Motocross World Championships. He won the final two races of the season allowing him to leap from fourth to second place in the championship final points standings. Hansen, Hans Maisch (Maico) and Vladimir Kavinov (KTM) finished the season separated by just three points in the final standings. Hansen competed in his final World Championship race at the 1983 250cc Finnish Grand Prix at the age of 34.

Hansen won 12 individual heat races and 12 Grand Prix victories during his world championship racing career. He was a 250cc Motocross Vice Champion (1978) and won six Swedish Motocross Championships (1973, 1975-1978, 1982). Hansen was a member of six Swedish Motocross des Nations teams (1976-1979, 1981-1982) and ten Trophée des Nations teams (1970, 1973-1979, 1982-1983).

== Motocross Grand Prix Results ==
Points system from 1952 to 1968:

| Position | 1st | 2nd | 3rd | 4th | 5th | 6th |
|---|---|---|---|---|---|---|
| Points | 8 | 6 | 4 | 3 | 2 | 1 |

Points system from 1969 to 1980:

| Position | 1 | 2 | 3 | 4 | 5 | 6 | 7 | 8 | 9 | 10 |
|---|---|---|---|---|---|---|---|---|---|---|
| Points | 15 | 12 | 10 | 8 | 6 | 5 | 4 | 3 | 2 | 1 |

| Year | Class | Team | 1 | | 2 | | 3 | | 4 | | 5 | | 6 | | 7 | | 8 | | 9 | | 10 | | 11 | | 12 | | 13 | | 14 | | Pos | Pts |
| Year | Class | Team | R1 | R2 | R1 | R2 | R1 | R2 | R1 | R2 | R1 | R2 | R1 | R2 | R1 | R2 | R1 | R2 | R1 | R2 | R1 | R2 | R1 | R2 | R1 | R2 | R1 | R2 | R1 | R2 | Pos | Pts |
|---|---|---|---|---|---|---|---|---|---|---|---|---|---|---|---|---|---|---|---|---|---|---|---|---|---|---|---|---|---|---|---|---|
| 1968 | 250cc | Husqvarna | ESP - | ESP - | BEL - | BEL - | CZE - | CZE - | FRA - | FRA - | NED - | NED - | GER - | GER - | LUX - | LUX - | POL; 6 | POL - | USR - | USR - | YUG - | YUG - | FIN - | FIN - | SWE - | SWE - | UK; 12 | UK - | AUT; 4 | AUT; 6 | 22nd | 2 |
| 1970 | 250cc | Husqvarna | ESP; 16 | ESP - | FRA; 3 | FRA; 1 | BEL; 4 | BEL; 14 | YUG; 11 | YUG - | ITA - | ITA; 3 | USR; 5 | USR - | POL; 5 | POL - | UK; 7 | UK; 3 | FIN; 3 | FIN; 3 | GDR; 9 | GDR - | CH; 4 | CH - | AUT - | AUT - | | | | | 8th | 35 |
| 1971 | 250cc | Husqvarna | ESP; 7 | ESP - | CH - | CH - | POL - | POL - | GER; 4 | GER; 1 | YUG; 8 | YUG; 6 | ITA - | ITA - | NED - | NED - | GDR - | GDR - | FIN - | FIN - | SWE - | SWE - | UK - | UK - | AUT - | AUT - | | | | | 12th | 17 |
| 1972 | 250cc | Husqvarna | ESP - | ESP - | FRA - | FRA - | NED - | NED - | CZE - | CZE; 10 | YUG - | YUG - | GER - | GER - | POL - | POL - | USR - | USR - | FIN - | FIN - | SWE; 7 | SWE; 4 | UK; 8 | UK; 13 | CH - | CH - | | | | | 18th | 9 |
| 1973 | 250cc | Kawasaki | ESP; 4 | ESP - | ITA - | ITA; 4 | BEL; 6 | BEL - | CH; 5 | CH - | POL; 6 | POL; 3 | YUG; 4 | YUG - | FRA - | FRA - | FIN - | FIN - | USR; 3 | USR; 3 | SWE; 2 | SWE; 2 | AUT; 2 | AUT; 3 | | | | | | | 4th | 111 |
| 1974 | 250cc | Kawasaki | ESP - | ESP - | ITA - | ITA - | CZE; 4 | CZE - | POL - | POL - | YUG; 1 | YUG; 3 | UK; 2 | UK; 1 | GER - | GER - | NED; 5 | NED - | FIN - | FIN - | SWE; 1 | SWE; 3 | CH - | CH; 3 | | | | | | | 4th | 101 |
| 1975 | 250cc | Kawasaki | ESP - | ESP; 4 | AUT; 7 | AUT - | BEL; 7 | BEL - | CZE - | CZE - | POL - | POL - | YUG - | YUG - | GER; 1 | GER - | UK - | UK - | FRA - | FRA - | SWE - | SWE; 3 | FIN; 3 | FIN - | CH; 1 | CH - | | | | | 10th | 66 |
| 1976 | 250cc | Kawasaki | ESP; 2 | ESP; 2 | BEL - | BEL - | CZE; 3 | CZE; 2 | POL; 3 | POL; 2 | USR - | USR - | YUG - | YUG - | ITA - | ITA - | FRA - | FRA - | UK - | UK; 8 | GER - | GER - | NED; 2 | NED - | SWE - | SWE; 2 | | | | | 6th | 95 |
| 1977 | 250cc | Kawasaki | ESP - | ESP - | CH - | CH; 3 | BEL - | BEL; 4 | CZE - | CZE - | ITA; 5 | ITA; 3 | AUT - | AUT - | USR - | USR - | YUG - | YUG; 4 | GER; 5 | GER; 3 | UK - | UK - | SWE - | SWE - | FIN - | FIN - | | | | | 11th | 58 |
| 1978 | 250cc | Kawasaki | ESP; 3 | ESP - | ITA - | ITA - | CZE; 1 | CZE; 3 | YUG; 1 | YUG; 2 | AUT - | AUT - | GER; 2 | GER; 2 | UK - | UK - | FRA - | FRA - | USA - | USA; 4 | SWE - | SWE; 6 | FIN; 1 | FIN; 2 | USR; 2 | USR; 1 | | | | | 2nd | 153 |
| 1982 | 250cc | Yamaha | CH - | CH - | ESP - | ESP - | BEL - | BEL - | CZE - | CZE - | ITA - | ITA - | FRA - | FRA - | UK - | UK - | NED - | NED - | USR - | USR - | USA - | USA - | FIN; 5 | FIN - | SWE - | SWE; 5 | | | | | 22nd | 12 |
| 1983 | 250cc | Yamaha | ESP - | ESP - | FRA - | FRA - | ITA - | ITA - | NED - | NED - | BUL - | BUL - | GER - | GER - | UK - | UK - | CAN - | CAN - | USA - | USA - | CH - | CH - | SWE; 1 | SWE; 2 | FIN - | FIN; 2 | | | | | 10th | 39 |
