= Christophe Pourcel =

French motorcycle racer (born 1988)

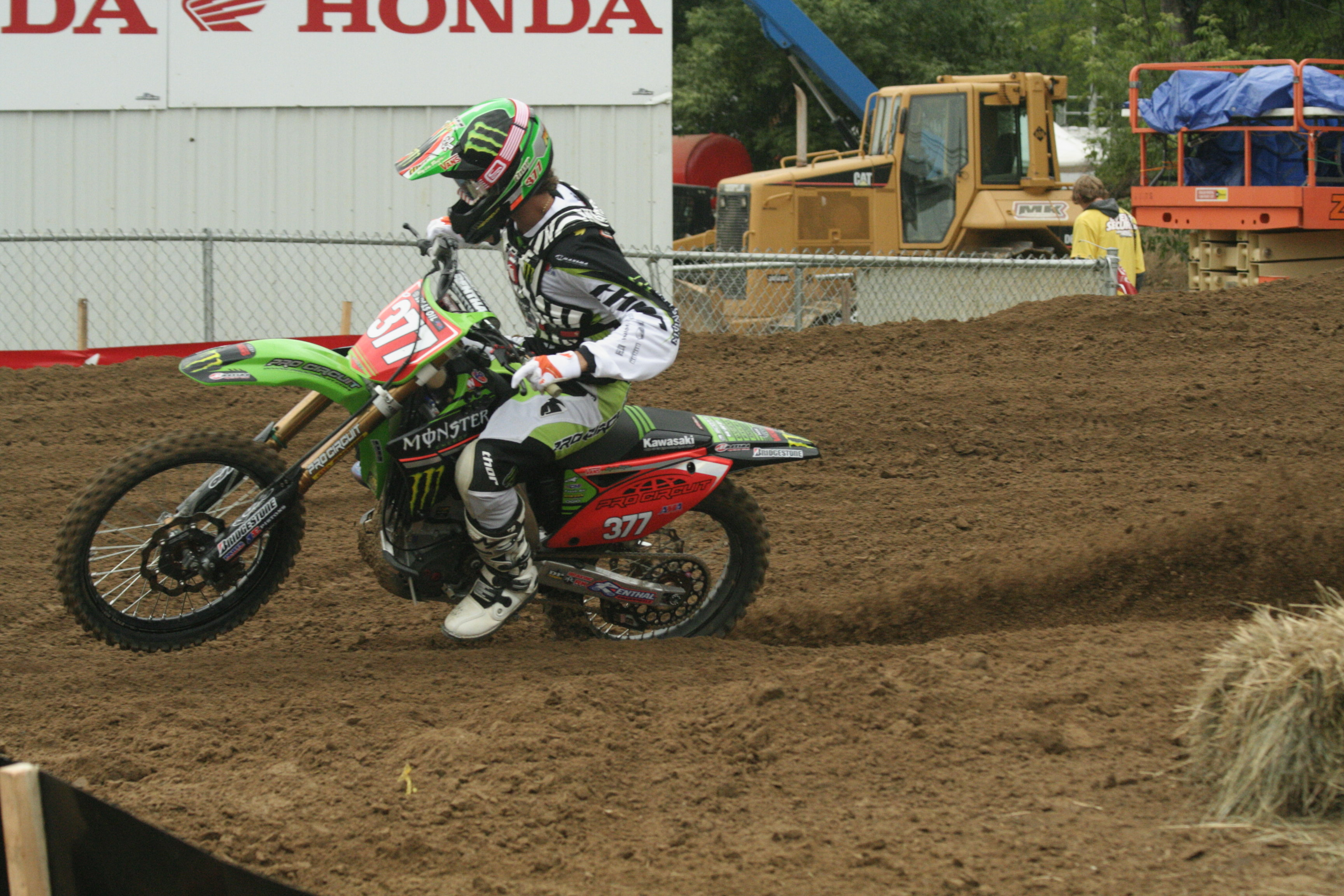
- Pourcel in 2009
- Nationality: French
- Born: 16 August 1988 (age 38) Marseille, France

Motocross career
- Years active: 2004 - 2017
- Teams: Kawasaki, Yamaha, Husqvarna
- Championships: GP-MX2 - 2006; AMA-Lites East - 2009, 2010
- Wins: FIM - 13; AMA - 26

Christophe Pourcel (born 16 August 1988), is a French former professional motocross and supercross racer. He competed in the Motocross World Championships and in the AMA Motocross Championships from 2004 to 2016 and then raced his final season in the 2017 CMA Canadian motocross national championship.

Known for his smooth riding style and intelligent racing tactics, Pourcel is notable for winning the 2006 FIM MX2 world championship and, for narrowly losing two consecutive AMA 250cc motocross national championships after suffering misfortune in the final rounds. Despite his smooth riding style, his motocross career was marred by numerous injuries which limited his success. Pourcel is the younger brother of former professional motocross racer Sébastien Pourcel.

== Motocross career ==
=== World championship debut ===
Pourcel was born in Marseille, France. He made his world championship motocross debut at the age of 16 riding a Kawasaki at the 2004 MX2 French Grand Prix. The following year in his first full season of competition, he scored his first race victory by defeating the eventual world champion Tony Cairoli in the second moto of the 2005 MX2 Czech Republic Grand Prix. Pourcel finished the season ranked fifth in the world championship overall results. In 2006, he triumphed over Cairoli in a season-long struggle for the 2006 MX2 Motocross World Championship, becoming the eighth Frenchman to win a Motocross World Championship and the third youngest rider ever to win one. Cairoli would become one of the most successful motocross competitors in history by winning nine world championships.

Before the start of the 2007 FIM Motocross World Championship, Pourcel traveled to the United States to compete in the three-race 250 West Supercross championship where he finished first, second and 21st. On August 22, 2007, Pourcel was involved in a serious accident at the Grand Prix of Northern Ireland. He suffered a broken back, which resulted in partial paralysis for an extended period of time, causing him to miss the entire 2008 season.

=== Move to America ===
After recovering from his injuries, Pourcel signed a contract to compete in the AMA Motocross Championship for the Team Pro Circuit-Kawasaki team. He made an impressive return from his injuries by winning his first race back at the season opening round of the 2009 AMA Supercross East championship. Pourcel went on to win the 2009 AMA Supercross East championship in convincing fashion by claiming four victories in the eight-race series. He then won the 2009 Las Vegas East/West Supercross Lites Shootout that featured the top competitors in the Supercross East and Supercross West championships including the western champion Ryan Dungey.

Pourcel then engaged in a season-long battle with Dungey for the 250cc AMA Motocross National Championship. The two competitors exchanged victories back and forth throughout the season with Pourcel holding the championship lead going into the final three motos of the year. However, his motorcycle suffered a mechanical failure at the Southwick National costing him the championship. Although Pourcel won the final race of the year, Dungey finished in second place to claim the national championship over Pourcel by 11 points.

In 2010, Pourcel successfully defended his AMA Supercross East championship. With Dungey moving up to the 450cc class, Pourcel was able to build a nine-point lead over Trey Canard going into the final race of the 250cc AMA Motocross National Championship, and only had to secure a third place to clinch the title. In a dramatic turn of events, Pourcel suffered a crash in the final race and separated his shoulder, allowing Canard to claim the national championship.

Pourcel had planned on moving up to the 450cc class with Kawasaki for the 2011 season but, when Jake Weimer got the job instead, Pourcel was signed by the MotoConcepts Yamaha team managed by former racer David Vuillemin. After a troublesome two-race stint in which Pourcel was not comfortable with his machinery, he failed to appear at the Budds Creek round and was released by the team for failing to meet his contractual obligations. With no options available in the American racing series, Pourcel returned to Europe to compete in the MX1 Motocross World Championship.

=== Return to the world championships ===
Pourcel entered in five races with his best results being two 2nd place finishes and ended the 2011 season ranked 17th in the MX1 world championship. He joined his brother Sébastien in the Team CLS Monster Energy Kawasaki Pro Circuit team competing in the MX1 world championship. In the 2012 MX1 World Championship, Pourcel won two Grand Prix races along with five second place results to improve to fourth in the final championship standings.

=== Second stint in America ===
Pourcel decided not to race in 2013 and took a year off before returning to America to compete in the 2014 250cc AMA Motocross National Championship with the Valli Yamaha team, winning one race and finishing sixth in the championship final standings. He then signed a contract to race for the Rockstar Husqvarna team in the 450cc national championship, replacing the injured Martin Davalos. He scored respectable results to finish the 2015 season ranked fifth in the 450cc national championship although, he wasn't the same rider physically as his numerous injuries took their toll on his performance.

In the 2016 season, Pourcel sustained a non-displaced fracture in his neck at the ninth round of the championship which forced him to miss the remainder of the season. Because Pourcel was no longer comfortable racing supercross, the Husqvarna team decided to enter him in the Canadian Motocross National Championship in 2017 where, finished second in points to Matt Goerke. Pourcel announced his retirement after the 2017 season at the age of 29.

== Career Results ==
Year	Rnd 1	Rnd 2	Rnd 3	Rnd 4	Rnd 5	Rnd 6	Rnd 7	Rnd 8	Rnd 9	Rnd 10	Rnd 11	Rnd 12	Rnd 13	Rnd 14	Rnd 15	Rnd 16	Rnd 17	Average Finish	Podium Percent	Place
2006 MX2	5	5	2	1	4	3	3	6	4	2	2	2	2	1	3	-	-	3.00	67%	1st
2007 MX2	4	2	11	5	2	1	2	4	4	1	5	9	OUT	OUT	OUT	-	-	4.17	42%	3rd
2009 SX-E	-	-	-	1	-	-	-	1	2	1	4	5	1	1	-	-	1	1.89	78%	1st
2009 250 MX	2	1	2	1	2	2	2	3	1	2	18	1	-	-	-	-	-	3.08	92%	2nd
2010 SX-E	-	-	-	-	-	-	1	1	1	3	7	1	1	20	-	-	3	3.89	78%	1st
2010 250 MX	2	1	2	4	1	3	5	2	7	5	2	37	-	-	-	-	-	6.17	58%	3rd
