= Sven Breugelmans =

Belgian motorcycle racer (born 1979)

- Nationality: Belgian
- Born: 12 August 1979 (age 47)

Motocross career
- Years active: 1999 - 2008
- Teams: Suzuki, KTM
- Championships: MX3 - 2005, 2008
- Wins: 10

Sven Breugelmans (born 12 August 1979) is a Belgian former professional motocross racer. He competed in the Motocross World Championships from 1999 to 2008. Breugelmans is notable for being a two-time F.I.M. motocross world championship in the MX3-GP class for 650cc motorcycles.

Breugelmans was born in Turnhout, Belgium. In 1999 he competed in the 125cc motocross world championships, finishing the season ranked 31st on a Kawasaki. He switched to riding a Yamaha in the 2000 125cc world championship and improved to 23rd and then finished the 2001 season ranked 12th.

In 2003, Breugelmans joined the Sylvain Geboers Suzuki team to compete in the MXGP class but, a serious injury suffered at the British Grand Prix ended his season. Breugelmans joined the KTM team for the 2004 MX1 world championship for 450cc motorcycles and was ranked 28th at the end of the season.

Breugelmans won the 2005 MX3-GP motocross world championship riding for the KTM team run by former world champion Jacky Martens. He finished as runner-up to Yves Demaria in the 2006 and 2007 MX3-GP world championships, before reclaiming the title in 2008.
