= Daryl Ecklund =

American motorcycle racer

- Nationality: American
- Born: August 3, 1985 (age 41) Lancaster, California

Motocross career
- Years active: 2007-2008
- Teams: Wyvern Motosports

Daryl Ecklund (born August 3, 1985) is an American former professional motocross rider and motorsports journalist. He competed in the AMA Motocross Championships in 2007 and 2008.

Following in his father's footsteps, Ecklund started riding in motorcycles at the age of three and entered his first race at the age of five. Daryl's father instilled in him a strong work ethic and desire for success. Ecklund started competing in the amateur nationals at the age of twelve, with consistent finishes in the top five.

In 2005, Ecklund raced the Four Stroke Nationals in both the Premier and the 250F class and finished the season second overall in points for both classes. In 2006, Ecklund signed with the fledgling Wyvern Motosports, riding the entire Supercross season in the 125 Lites Class. Following his professional motocross career, he became the Managing Editor for Motocross Action Magazine.
