= Mark Jones (motocross rider) =

Mark Jones (born 12 April 1979 in Bridgend, Wales) is a professional motocross rider who has been ranked in the top ten riders in the United Kingdom and as the Welsh number one. He has won motocross titles since 1993, as the first title was the 1993 All British and BSMA 100 cc Championship. He has been riding the sport of motocross for 25 years; in 2007, Jones rode with Wulfsport Kawasaki. Jones may have competed in the British Open class championship, British Masters and selected Grands Prix events.

Jones was forced to retire due to injury in 2009, but remains one of two Welsh rider to achieve a World Championship Grand Prix podium, the other being Chris 'Factory' Brockway. He is now a full-time motocross coach to up and coming motocross racers.
