= Yves Demaria =

French motorcycle racer

- Nationality: French
- Born: 22 January 1972 (age 54) Marseille, France

Motocross career
- Years active: 1988-2007
- Teams: KTM, Yamaha
- Championships: MX3-GP - 2004, 2006, 2007
- Wins: 37

Yves Demaria (born 22 January 1972) is a French former professional motocross racer. He competed in the Motocross World Championships from 1988 to 2007. He is a three-time FIM Motocross World Champion in the MX3-GP class for motorcycles displacing 650cc.

== Biography ==
Born in Marseille, France, Demaria won his first MX3 world championship in 2004, following with two more crowns in 2006 and 2007. He has also won Grand Prix races in the MX1-GP and MX2-GP classes.

Demaria won 69 individual heat races and 37 Grand Prix victories during his world championship racing career. Along with his three World Championships, he was a 17-time French motocross national champion. He was a member of seven French Motocross des Nations teams, including the victorious French team at the 2001 Motocross des Nations that included David Vuillemin and Luigi Séguy.
