= 2008 FIM Motocross World Championship =

Motocross championship season

2008 Motocross World Championship

Seasons
- ← 2007 2009 →

The 2008 FIM Motocross World Championship was the 52nd F.I.M. Motocross Racing World Championship season.

== Grands Prix ==
Round	Date	Grand Prix	Location	Race 1 Winner	Race 2 Winner	Round Winner
MX1
1	April 6	Netherlands	Valkenswaard	(Belgium) Ken De Dycker	(Belgium) Ken De Dycker	(Belgium) Ken De Dycker
2	April 20	Spain	Bellpuig	(Belgium) Steve Ramon	Cancelled	(Belgium) Steve Ramon
3	April 27	Portugal	Águeda	(Italy) David Philippaerts	(France) Sebastien Pourcel	(France) Sebastien Pourcel
4	May 11	Bulgaria	Sevlievo	(Italy) David Philippaerts	(France) Sebastien Pourcel	(Italy) David Philippaerts
5	May 18	Italy	Mantova	(France) Sebastien Pourcel	(Germany) Maximilian Nagl	(Netherlands) Marc de Reuver
6	June 1	United Kingdom	Mallory Park	(Belgium) Ken De Dycker	(Spain) Jonathan Barragan	(Spain) Jonathan Barragan
7	June 15	France	St Jean d'Angély	(France) Sebastien Pourcel	(France) Sebastien Pourcel	(France) Sebastien Pourcel
8	June 29	Germany	Teutschenthal	(New Zealand) Joshua Coppins	(New Zealand) Joshua Coppins	(New Zealand) Joshua Coppins
9	July 6	Sweden	Uddevalla	(Spain) Jonathan Barragan	(Germany) Maximilian Nagl	(Spain) Jonathan Barragan
10	July 20	South Africa	Nelspruit	(Belgium) Steve Ramon	(Spain) Jonathan Barragan	(Spain) Jonathan Barragan
11	August 3	Belgium	Lommel	(Netherlands) Marc de Reuver	(Spain) Jonathan Barragan	(Spain) Jonathan Barragan
12	August 10	Czech Republic	Loket	(Germany) Maximilian Nagl	(Italy) David Philippaerts	(Italy) David Philippaerts
13	August 31	Ireland	Dublin	(Belgium) Ken De Dycker	(Estonia) Tanel Leok	(Estonia) Tanel Leok
14	September 7	Benelux	Lierop	(Netherlands) Marc de Reuver	(Belgium) Ken De Dycker	(Netherlands) Marc de Reuver
15	September 14	Italy	Faenza	(Germany) Maximilian Nagl	(Germany) Maximilian Nagl	(Germany) Maximilian Nagl
MX2
1	April 6	Netherlands	Valkenswaard	(South Africa) Tyla Rattray	(South Africa) Tyla Rattray	(South Africa) Tyla Rattray
2	April 20	Spain	Bellpuig	(South Africa) Tyla Rattray	(Italy) Davide Guarneri	(Italy) Davide Guarneri
3	April 27	Portugal	Águeda	(Italy) Antonio Cairoli	(Italy) Antonio Cairoli	(Italy) Antonio Cairoli
4	May 11	Bulgaria	Sevlievo	(Italy) Antonio Cairoli	(United Kingdom) Tommy Searle	(United Kingdom) Tommy Searle
5	May 18	Italy	Mantova	(France) Nicolas Aubin	(Italy) Antonio Cairoli	(Italy) Antonio Cairoli
6	June 1	United Kingdom	Mallory Park	(South Africa) Tyla Rattray	(Italy) Antonio Cairoli	(Italy) Antonio Cairoli
7	June 15	France	St Jean d'Angély	(United Kingdom) Tommy Searle	(United Kingdom) Tommy Searle	(United Kingdom) Tommy Searle
8	June 29	Germany	Teutschenthal	(Italy) Antonio Cairoli	(South Africa) Tyla Rattray	(South Africa) Tyla Rattray
9	July 6	Sweden	Uddevalla	(South Africa) Tyla Rattray	(Italy) Antonio Cairoli	(Italy) Antonio Cairoli
10	July 20	South Africa	Nelspruit	(United Kingdom) Tommy Searle	(South Africa) Tyla Rattray	(United Kingdom) Tommy Searle
11	August 3	Belgium	Lommel	(South Africa) Tyla Rattray	(Estonia) Gert Krestinov	(Estonia) Gert Krestinov
12	August 10	Czech Republic	Loket	(South Africa) Tyla Rattray	(United Kingdom) Tommy Searle	(United Kingdom) Tommy Searle
13	August 31	Ireland	Dublin	(United States) Zach Osborne	(South Africa) Tyla Rattray	(South Africa) Tyla Rattray
14	September 7	Benelux	Lierop	(South Africa) Tyla Rattray	(South Africa) Tyla Rattray	(South Africa) Tyla Rattray
15	September 14	Italy	Faenza	(United Kingdom) Tommy Searle	(United Kingdom) Tommy Searle	(United Kingdom) Tommy Searle
MX3
1	April 6	Spain	Talavera de la Reina	(Czech Republic) Jan Zaremba	(France) Thomas Allier	(France) Thomas Allier
2	April 13	France	Castelnau-de-Lévis	(France) Sébastien Pourcel	(France) Sébastien Pourcel	(France) Sébastien Pourcel
3	April 27	Italy	San Severino Marche	(Italy) Cristian Beggi	(Italy) Cristian Beggi	(Italy) Cristian Beggi
4	May 4	France	Plomion	(France) Thomas Allier	(Belgium) Sven Breugelmans	(Belgium) Sven Breugelmans
5	May 18	Portugal	Cortelha	(Belgium) Sven Breugelmans	(France) Thomas Allier	(Belgium) Sven Breugelmans
6	May 25	Spain	Alhama de Murcia	(Spain) Jonathan Barragán	(Spain) Jonathan Barragán	(Spain) Jonathan Barragán
7	June 8	Croatia	Mladina	(Italy) Cristian Beggi	Race cancelled	(Italy) Cristian Beggi
8	June 15	Bulgaria	Samokov	(France) Thomas Allier	(France) Christophe Martin	(France) Christophe Martin
9	July 6	Netherlands	Markelo	(France) Thomas Allier	(Belgium) Sven Breugelmans	(Belgium) Sven Breugelmans
10	July 13	Slovenia	Orehova Vas	(Italy) Alex Salvini	(Slovenia) Saso Kragelj	(Italy) Alex Salvini
11	July 20	Slovakia	Sverepec	(France) Thomas Allier	(Belgium) Patrick Caps	(France) Thomas Allier
12	August 3	Chile	Laguna Caren	(France) Thomas Allier	(Italy) Cristian Beggi	(Italy) Cristian Beggi
13	August 17	Finland	Heinola	(Belgium) Sven Breugelmans	(Belgium) Sven Breugelmans	(Belgium) Sven Breugelmans
14	August 24	Denmark	Randers	(Belgium) Sven Breugelmans	(Belgium) Sven Breugelmans	(Belgium) Sven Breugelmans
15	September 7	Switzerland	Roggenburg	(Belgium) Sven Breugelmans	(Spain) Álvaro Lozano Rico	(Spain) Álvaro Lozano Rico
16	September 14	Germany	Jauer	(France) Christophe Martin	(France) Christophe Martin	(France) Christophe Martin

== MX1 ==
=== Entry list ===
Full-time Grand Prix Teams & Riders
Team	Constructor	No	Rider	Rounds
CAS Honda	Honda	3	(United States) Mike Brown	1–7
CAS Honda	Honda	141	(France) Steve Boniface	8–12
CAS Honda	Honda	211	(United Kingdom) Billy MacKenzie	1–13, 15
Monster Energy Yamaha	Yamaha	6	(New Zealand) Josh Coppins	All
Monster Energy Yamaha	Yamaha	19	(Italy) David Philippaerts	All
Silver Action KTM	KTM	7	(Spain) Jonathan Barragan	All
Kawasaki Racing Team Europe	Kawasaki	8	(Estonia) Tanel Leok	All
Kawasaki Racing Team Europe	Kawasaki	32	(Belgium) Manuel Priem	All
Teka Suzuki WMX1 Factory Team	Suzuki	9	(Belgium) Ken De Dycker	All
Teka Suzuki WMX1 Factory Team	Suzuki	11	(Belgium) Steve Ramon	All
Teka Suzuki WMX1 Factory Team	Suzuki	144	(Japan) Yohei Kojima	15
Team Aprilia Off Road	Aprilia	10	(Belgium) Cedric Melotte	1–9, 11, 14–15
Red Bull KTM	KTM	12	(Germany) Max Nagl	All
Delta Racing Team	Suzuki	13	(Finland) Antti Pyrhonen	1–4
Delta Racing Team	Suzuki	36	(Portugal) Luis Correia	8–9, 11–15
Martin Honda	Honda	14	(Netherlands) Marc de Reuver	1–9, 11–15
Martin Honda	Honda	15	(Switzerland) Julien Bill	1–13, 15
Team KTM UK	KTM	16	(United Kingdom) James Noble	2–13
Teka Suzuki	Suzuki	17	(France) Pierre-Alexandre Renet	1–7, 14–15
Teka Suzuki	Suzuki	22	(Belgium) Marvin van Daele	1–3
Moto Race Team	Suzuki	23	(Italy) Alex Salvini	1–4, 7–9, 11–15
Molson Kawasaki UK	Kawasaki	24	(United Kingdom) Tom Church	All
Inotec Suzuki	Suzuki	25	(Belgium) Clement Desalle	All
Inotec Suzuki	Suzuki	77	(Germany) Daniel Siegl	1–8, 11
Sarholz KTM	KTM	27	(Germany) Marcus Schiffer	1–11, 13–15
Sarholz KTM	KTM	108	(Hungary) Kornel Nemeth	1–12
MtM Grand Prix Team	Suzuki	28	(New Zealand) Scott Columb	1–9, 11–15
MtM Grand Prix Team	Suzuki	193	(Belgium) Danny Theybers	11
Team GPKR	Kawasaki	29	(France) Alexandre Rouis	1–7
Team GPKR	Kawasaki	90	(France) Sebastien Pourcel	All
Team GPKR	Kawasaki	161	(Belgium) Kevin Strijbos	1–2, 12–13
JK Racing	Yamaha	45	(France) Loic Leonce	1–5, 7–9, 11–15
JK Racing	Aprilia	87	(France) Fabien Izoird	1–5
Van Beers Racing Yamaha	Yamaha	56	(Latvia) Lauris Freibergs	1–9
Van Beers Racing Yamaha	Yamaha	111	(Estonia) Aigar Leok	1–9, 11–15
Suzuki Swift Motocross Team	Suzuki	60	(United Kingdom) Brad Anderson	1, 4–9, 11–12
Rabbit Kawasaki	Kawasaki	78	(Netherlands) Bas Verhoeven	1–3, 6–7, 11–12
Team Sturm Kawasaki	Kawasaki	88	(France) Mike Luxembourger	11–12, 14
Team Sturm Kawasaki	Kawasaki	98	(United States) Jacob Saylor	1–5, 7–8, 11–13, 15
UTAG-Yamaha.com	Yamaha	115	(Spain) Carlos Campano	2–15
Team TM Racing	TM	121	(Italy) Alessio Chiodi	1–9, 11–12
Team TM Racing	TM	179	(Czech Republic) Martin Michek	12, 15
Wild Card Teams & Riders
Team	Constructor	No	Rider	Rounds
CLS Kawasaki	Kawasaki	20	(France) Greg Aranda	12–15
PAR Homes Honda	Honda	21	(Republic of Ireland) Gordon Crockard	13
PAR Homes Honda	Honda	40	(United Kingdom) Jordan Rose	6
PAR Homes Honda	Honda	177	(United Kingdom) Ray Rowson	6–7, 14
Pater MX Team	KTM	30	(Netherlands) Patrick Roos	1, 11, 14
	Yamaha	31	(Netherlands) William Saris	1, 11, 14
	Yamaha	33	(France) Cyrille Coulon	1, 7
J. Elias Kawasaki	Kawasaki	34	(Spain) Albert Armengol	2
Repsol Honda Moto Garrano	Honda	35	(Portugal) Paulo Gonçalves	3
LF Sport Competições	Yamaha	36	(Portugal) Luis Correia	3
ARB Kawasaki	Kawasaki	37	(United Kingdom) Mark Jones	6
ARB Kawasaki	Kawasaki	49	(United Kingdom) Jamie Lewis	6
Pioneer Yamaha	Yamaha	38	(United Kingdom) Wayne Smith	6
Twisted7 Kawasaki	Kawasaki	39	(United Kingdom) Bryan MacKenzie	6, 9
Twisted7 Kawasaki	Kawasaki	52	(United Kingdom) Richard Lawson	6
STR Honda	Honda	43	(United Kingdom) Jim Murro	6
	Kawasaki	46	(Greece) Alexandros Papanikolakis	4
	KTM	47	(Greece) Konstandinos Terzis	4
Relentless Suzuki	Suzuki	50	(United Kingdom) Jamie Law	6
DBS KTM	KTM	51	(United Kingdom) Luke Mellows	6
Schruf Racing Team	KTM	54	(Austria) Michael Staufer	8
Team Kosak KTM	KTM	55	(Germany) Manuel Chittaro	8
Elf Team Pfeil Kawasaki	Kawasaki	57	(Czech Republic) Filip Neugebauer	8, 15
LPE Kawasaki	Kawasaki	58	(United Kingdom) Jamie Smith	13
Team Suzuki Austria	Suzuki	59	(Austria) Oswald Reisinger	8, 12
j.e Racing	KTM	61	(Sweden) Kim Lindström	9
	Honda	62	(Sweden) Max Nyberg	9
	Yamaha	63	(Sweden) Mats Nilsson	9
HDI MX KTM	KTM	65	(France) Julien Vanni	7–9
Team Zenner Yamaha	Yamaha	69	(Namibia) Tommy Gous	10
	Yamaha	70	(Zambia) Dale Holliday	10
	Honda	71	(Zambia) Graham Lionnet	10
Team Suzuki South Africa	Suzuki	73	(South Africa) Brandon Wheeler	10
Team Suzuki South Africa	Suzuki	96	(South Africa) Richard van der Westhuizen	10
	Yamaha	74	(South Africa) Johannes de Bruin	10
	KTM	75	(South Africa) Marnus du Plessis	10
Pelotrain Indo-Atlantic Yamaha	Yamaha	80	(South Africa) Anthony Raynard	10
Team Bulgaria Yamaha	Yamaha	81	(Bulgaria) Nikolay Kumanov	4
	KTM	82	(Bulgaria) Boncho Avramov	4
	KTM	83	(South Africa) Kyle Bowen	10
	Honda	84	(South Africa) Jaryd Geldenhuys	10
	Suzuki	85	(South Africa) Gerhard Hanekom	10
Team Oriol P. Yamaha	Yamaha	86	(Spain) Adrian Garrido	2
	Yamaha	89	(South Africa) Roger Bergstrom	10
	Yamaha	91	(United Kingdom) Tom Porter	10
	Kawasaki	92	(France) Maxime Emery	7, 12
	Yamaha	93	(Sweden) Magnus Lindfors	9
Honda City Racing	Honda	94	(Sweden) Jonas Bodin	9
Yamaha Centre Östersund	Yamaha	95	(Sweden) Robert Carlsson	9
	Honda	97	(Belgium) Bart Goelen	11
	Yamaha	101	(France) Mike Valade	12
	Yamaha	102	(Czech Republic) Jiri Cepelak	12
	Honda	103	(Czech Republic) Petr Bartos	12
Auto Company Moscow Region	Yamaha	107	(Russia) Dmitry Parshin	1
	Honda	109	(Estonia) Juss Laansoo	14
	Suzuki	114	(France) Raphael Beaudouin	7
Team Silent Sport	KTM	118	(Germany) Dennis Schröter	14
JM Racing Team	KTM	123	(Belgium) Yentel Martens	14
LS Motorsport	Honda	124	(Belgium) Tom de Belder	14
DMX Racing Honda	Honda	127	(Belgium) Jan Lauryssen	14
TAS Suzuki	Suzuki	133	(United Kingdom) Wayne Garrett	13
Team Suzuki Reinecke	Suzuki	134	(Slovenia) Jaka Moze	8
	Yamaha	141	(France) Steve Boniface	7
	Honda	142	(Netherlands) Rob van Uden	14
Orange Team KTM Italia	KTM	150	(Italy) Matteo Dottori	15
DAM Racing KTM	KTM	153	(Belgium) Jurgen van Nooten	1, 11
CCM TM	TM	162	(Republic of Ireland) Stuart Edmonds	13
Sonas GOMX Suzuki	Suzuki	181	(Republic of Ireland) Ross Brown	13
	TM	280	(Belgium) Steve Seronval	14

=== Championship standings ===
==== Riders' Championship ====
Pos	Rider	Manufacturer	NED (Netherlands)		ESP (Spain)		POR (Portugal)		BUL (Bulgaria)		ITA (Italy)		GBR (United Kingdom)		FRA (France)		GER (Germany)		SWE (Sweden)		RSA (South Africa)		BEL (Belgium)		CZE (Czech Republic)		IRL (Republic of Ireland)		BEN (Benelux)		ITA (Italy)		Points
1	(Italy) Philippaerts	Yamaha	4	6	2	c	1	2	1	2	5	2	5	3	13	Ret	3	6	4	4	2	6	15	6	3	1	4	4	3	5	3	9	509
2	(Belgium) Ramon	Suzuki	3	4	1	c	6	4	5	3	6	9	2	7	11	3	2	18	3	3	1	8	4	5	4	4	5	2	7	8	11	2	495
3	(Belgium) de Dycker	Suzuki	1	1	3	c	14	Ret	10	11	2	6	1	6	6	11	4	2	8	8	5	7	3	3	8	3	1	3	8	1	2	5	490
4	(Spain) Barragan	KTM	Ret	3	Ret	c	3	7	2	4	10	Ret	3	1	3	6	14	Ret	1	2	3	1	2	1	2	5	10	12	2	13	4	4	455
5	(New Zealand) Coppins	Yamaha	6	7	4	c	5	3	4	7	4	5	11	12	2	2	1	1	13	5	9	4	5	8	7	10	9	Ret	4	6	10	3	446
6	(Germany) Nagl	KTM	2	5	19	c	12	12	11	9	12	1	4	Ret	5	8	Ret	4	12	1	4	2	6	2	1	9	7	6	5	2	1	1	444
7	(France) Pourcel	Kawasaki	16	Ret	Ret	c	2	1	8	1	1	7	Ret	2	1	1	7	5	11	DNS	8	3	7	4	5	2	6	9	9	12	Ret	Ret	392
8	(Estonia) T.Leok	Kawasaki	11	Ret	5	c	8	10	7	14	7	8	6	5	4	17	6	3	9	10	6	11	18	13	6	6	2	1	6	Ret	Ret	6	352
9	(United Kingdom) Bi.MacKenzie	Honda	10	2	8	c	4	6	15	6	9	4	10	4	DNQ	DNQ	15	10	7	6	7	5	9	11	Ret	DNS	3	5			5	10	320
10	(Netherlands) de Reuver	Honda	8	DNS	Ret	c	7	8	3	5	3	3	9	11	Ret	4	Ret	Ret	2	Ret			1	10	15	17	13	Ret	1	3	6	Ret	292
11	(Belgium) Desalle	Suzuki	Ret	11	9	c	10	11	9	Ret	13	11	7	13	7	15	10	13	5	9	Ret	10	8	17	9	8	14	8	11	4	8	7	290
12	(Belgium) Priem	Kawasaki	5	8	15	c	17	20	14	12	DNS	10	12	14	9	12	8	9	17	17	10	9	10	19	11	7	8	7	12	9	14	12	261
13	(Switzerland) Bill	Honda	25	22	21	c	11	Ret	6	8	24	Ret	21	8	10	7	5	7	10	7	11	Ret	22	14	Ret	Ret	Ret	10			7	11	183
14	(Estonia) A.Leok	Yamaha	12	10	23	c	22	DNS	18	16	8	Ret	8	15	Ret	DNS	9	8	14	16			12	9	16	13	11	17	13	10	Ret	Ret	164
15	(Hungary) Nemeth	KTM	9	9	12	c	18	9	13	15	14	16	15	Ret	8	19	11	20	Ret	12	Ret	DNS	11	7	10	12							159
16	(Germany) Schiffer	KTM	19	12	18	c	13	16	16	13	11	12	14	16	Ret	DNS	Ret	15	Ret	DNS	12	12	19	Ret			16	13	10	7	9	Ret	147
17	(United Kingdom) Church	Kawasaki	Ret	15	7	c	DNQ	DNQ	Ret	Ret	18	13	Ret	Ret	17	16	20	19	16	14	16	15	23	15	Ret	19	12	18	19	16	12	14	109
18	(United States) Brown	Honda	15	13	Ret	c	9	5	12	10	19	15	16	9	12	10																	107
19	(United Kingdom) Noble	KTM			14	c	15	14	21	18	15	Ret	13	10	16	9	Ret	DNS	15	13	14	14	Ret	Ret	21	Ret	20	Ret					94
20	(France) Boniface	Yamaha													15	5	Ret	Ret	6	11	13	13	Ret	DNS	14	16							75
21	(Spain) Campano	Yamaha			Ret	c	21	13	19	17	20	23	22	Ret	Ret	21	16	11	24	20	15	16	DNQ	21	19	21	18	16	22	15	18	8	74
22	(Italy) Salvini	Suzuki	20	21	11	c	16	18	27	Ret					Ret	24	12	12	19	Ret			Ret	Ret	17	14	19	15	Ret	Ret	17	13	70
23	(United Kingdom) Anderson	Suzuki	Ret	Ret					Ret	20	23	14	19	Ret	Ret	14	18	14	18	Ret			20	12	13	15							54
24	(Belgium) Strijbos	Kawasaki	7	14	6	c																			Ret	18	21	DNS					39
25	(France) Renet	Suzuki	18	Ret	16	c	20	15	20	23	Ret	17	17	17	Ret	Ret													Ret	Ret	16	15	39
26	(France) Aranda	Kawasaki																							12	11	15	14	Ret	20	19	Ret	35
27	(Italy) Chiodi	TM	21	18	13	c	19	22	17	19	17	18	24	20	20	18	23	21	21	22			DNQ	DNQ	20	Ret							32
28	(Portugal) Correia	Suzuki					24	23									13	22	26	15			21	24	Ret	Ret	23	19	18	18	15	Ret	28
29	(New Zealand) Columb	Suzuki	23	Ret	DNQ	c	DNQ	DNQ	24	24	21	20	DNQ	DNQ	18	20	22	16	22	19			24	Ret	Ret	23	22	Ret	15	19	21	16	25
30	(Belgium) Melotte	Aprilia	DNQ	DNQ	Ret	c	23	Ret	22	DNS	Ret	21	20	Ret	DNQ	DNQ	17	Ret	25	23			14	Ret					17	14	Ret	DNS	23
31	(Latvia) Freibergs	Yamaha	22	16	10	c	25	21	DNQ	25	22	19	26	24	DNQ	DNQ	DNQ	17	23	21													22
32	(Netherlands) Roos	KTM	DNQ	DNQ																			13	16					14	Ret			20
33	(Netherlands) Saris	Yamaha	Ret	DNS																			17	Ret					16	11			19
34	(France) Leonce	Yamaha	24	Ret	20	c	DNQ	DNQ	25	21	16	Ret			Ret	Ret	19	Ret	20	18			Ret	20	22	Ret	24	Ret	20	17	20	Ret	19
35	(Belgium) van Daele	Suzuki	14	19	17	c	Ret	19																									15
36	(Republic of Ireland) Crockard	Honda																									17	11					14
37	(Czech Republic) Michek	TM																							18	Ret					13	19	13
38	(France) Coulon	Yamaha	DNQ	DNQ											19	13																	10
39	(Netherlands) Verhoeven	Kawasaki	13	20	DNQ	c	28	Ret					DNQ	22	DNQ	DNQ							25	DNS	DNQ	DNQ							9
40	(Belgium) Theybers	Suzuki																					16	18									8
41	(Finland) Pyrhonen	Suzuki	17	17	22	c	Ret	Ret	23	26																							8
42	(South Africa) v/d Westhuizen	Suzuki																			17	17											8
43	(France) Vanni	KTM													14	Ret	DNQ	DNQ	Ret	Ret													7
44	(South Africa) Wheeler	Suzuki																			19	18											5
45	(United Kingdom) W.Smith	Yamaha											18	19																			5
46	(United States) Saylor	Kawasaki	DNQ	DNQ	DNQ	c	DNQ	DNQ	26	Ret	26	Ret			DNQ	DNQ	DNQ	DNQ					DNQ	DNQ	DNQ	DNQ	Ret	21			Ret	17	4
47	(Portugal) Gonçalves	Honda					26	17																									4
48	(South Africa) Raynard	Yamaha																			18	20											4
49	(Japan) Kojima	Suzuki																													23	18	3
50	(United Kingdom) Rose	Honda											23	18																			3
51	(South Africa) de Bruin	Yamaha																			Ret	19											2
52	(South Africa) Bowen	KTM																			20	22											1
53	(Czech Republic) Čepelák	Yamaha																							23	20							1
54	(Italy) Dottori	KTM																													Ret	20	1
55	(Republic of Ireland) Edmonds	TM																									Ret	20					1
	(Germany) Siegl	Suzuki	DNQ	DNQ	Ret	c	27	24	Ret	22	DNQ	DNQ	25	21	Ret	22	Ret	Ret					DNQ	DNQ									0
	(Germany) Schroter	KTM																											21	22			0
	(France) Rouis	Kawasaki	DNQ	DNQ	DNQ	c	DNQ	DNQ	DNQ	DNQ	25	Ret	Ret	23	21	23																	0
	(Belgium) Lauryssen	Honda																											23	21			0
	(Slovenia) Moze	Suzuki															21	24															0
	(South Africa) Bergstrom	Yamaha																			Ret	21											0
	(South Africa) Geldenhuys	Honda																			21	Ret											0
	(South Africa) Hanekom	Suzuki																			22	23											0
	(Czech Republic) Bartos	Honda																							24	22							0
	(Czech Republic) Neugebauer	Kawasaki															DNQ	DNQ													22	Ret	0
	(United Kingdom) Garrett	Suzuki																									27	22					0
	(Belgium) van Nooten	KTM	DNQ	DNQ																			Ret	22									0
	(France) Izoird	Aprilia	DNQ	DNQ	DNQ	c	DNQ	DNQ	DNQ	DNQ	DNQ	22																					0
	(Austria) Reisinger	Suzuki															24	23							DNQ	Ret							0
	(Republic of Ireland) Brown	Suzuki																									25	23					0
	(South Africa) du Plessis	KTM																			23	Ret											0
	(Belgium) de Belder	Honda																											DNQ	23			0
	(Belgium) Martens	KTM																					DNQ	23									0
	(United Kingdom) J.Smith	Kawasaki																									26	24					0
	(United Kingdom) Porter	Yamaha																			24	26											0
	(Zambia) Lionnet	Honda																			Ret	24											0
	(Netherlands) van Uden	Honda																											24	Ret			0
	(Sweden) Nilsson	Yamaha																	DNQ	24													0
	(Namibia) Gous	Yamaha																			Ret	25											0
	(Sweden) Lindstrom	KTM																	DNQ	25													0
	(United Kingdom) Rowson	Honda											DNQ	DNQ	DNQ	DNQ													Ret	DNS			0
	(Zambia) Holliday	Yamaha																			DNQ	27											0
	(France) Emery	Kawasaki													DNQ	Ret									DNQ	DNQ							0
	(Belgium) Seronval	TM																											Ret	Ret			0
	(United Kingdom) Jones	Kawasaki											Ret	DNS																			0
	(Estonia) Laansoo	Honda																											DNS	Ret			0
	(Sweden) Bodin	Honda																	Ret	DNS													0
	(France) Luxembourger	Kawasaki																					DNQ	DNQ	DNQ	DNQ			DNQ	DNQ			0
	(United Kingdom) Br.Mackenzie	Kawasaki											DNQ	DNQ					DNQ	DNQ													0
	(Russia) Parshin	Honda	DNQ	DNQ																													0
	(Spain) Garrido	Yamamha			DNQ	c																											0
	(Spain) Armengol	Kawasaki			DNQ	c																											0
	(Bulgaria) Kumanov	Yamaha							DNQ	DNQ																							0
	(Greece) Terzis	KTM							DNQ	DNQ																							0
	(Greece) Papanikolakis	Kawasaki							DNQ	DNQ																							0
	(Bulgaria) Avramov	KTM							DNQ	DNQ																							0
	(United Kingdom) Murro	Honda											DNQ	DNQ																			0
	(United Kingdom) Lewis	Kawasaki											DNQ	DNQ																			0
	(United Kingdom) Law	Suzuki											DNQ	DNQ																			0
	(United Kingdom) Mellows	KTM											DNQ	DNQ																			0
	(United Kingdom) Lawson	Kawasaki											DNQ	DNQ																			0
	(France) Beaudouin	Suzuki													DNQ	DNQ																	0
	(Germany) Chittaro	KTM															DNQ	DNQ															0
	(Austria) Staufer	KTM															DNQ	DNQ															0
	(Sweden) Lindfors	Yamaha																	DNQ	DNQ													0
	(Sweden) Carlsson	Yamaha																	DNQ	DNQ													0
	(Sweden) Nyberg	Honda																	DNQ	DNQ													0
	(Belgium) Goelen	Honda																					DNQ	DNQ									0
	(France) Valade	Yamaha																							DNQ	DNQ							0

==== Manufacturers' Championship ====
Pos	Manufacturer	Points
1	(Japan) Suzuki	587
2	(Japan) Yamaha	583
3	(Austria) KTM	575
4	(Japan) Kawasaki	518
5	(Japan) Honda	470
6	(Italy) TM	43
7	(Italy) Aprilia	23

== MX2 ==
=== Entry list ===
Full-time Grand Prix Teams & Riders
Team	Constructor	No	Rider	Rounds
Red Bull KTM	KTM	2	(United Kingdom) Tommy Searle	All
Red Bull KTM	KTM	4	(South Africa) Tyla Rattray	All
Red Bull KTM	KTM	10	(Portugal) Rui Gonçalves	All
Molson Kawasaki UK	Kawasaki	5	(South Africa) Gareth Swanepoel	13–15
Molson Kawasaki UK	Kawasaki	7	(United Kingdom) Stephen Sword	1–7, 10–15
Molson Kawasaki UK	Kawasaki	11	(France) Gautier Paulin	1–6
SRS Racing-ST	Honda	8	(Finland) Matti Seistola	1, 4–9, 11–15
SRS Racing-ST	Honda	9	(Italy) Mauro Fiorgentili	1–3
SRS Racing-ST	Honda	41	(Italy) Angelo Pellegrini	1–8
3C Racing	Yamaha	12	(Italy) Deny Philippaerts	All
3C Racing	Yamaha	13	(Italy) Manuel Monni	All
UTAG-Yamaha.com	Yamaha	15	(Spain) Carlos Campano	1
UTAG-Yamaha.com	Yamaha	50	(United Kingdom) Martin Barr	1, 6, 8–9, 13
UTAG-Yamaha.com	Yamaha	62	(Slovenia) Klemen Gercar	15
UTAG-Yamaha.com	Yamaha	119	(United Kingdom) Mel Pocock	3–9, 13–14
UTAG-Yamaha.com	Yamaha	338	(United States) Zach Osborne	11–15
LS Motors Honda	Honda	18	(Belgium) Dennis Dierckx	2–9, 11
LS Motors Honda	Honda	69	(South Africa) Wyatt Avis	1–11
CLS Kawasaki	Kawasaki	20	(France) Greg Aranda	1–11
CLS Kawasaki	Kawasaki	183	(France) Steven Frossard	1–14
CLS Kawasaki	Kawasaki	202	(France) Loic Larrieu	7
HDI MX KTM	KTM	22	(France) Anthony Boissiere	All
HDI MX KTM	KTM	65	(France) Julien Vanni	2–6
Suso MVR-D Suzuki	Suzuki	23	(United Kingdom) Carl Nunn	1–9, 11–15
Suso MVR-D Suzuki	Suzuki	46	(United Kingdom) Jason Dougan	1–9, 11–13
Suso MVR-D Suzuki	Suzuki	76	(Sweden) Marcus Norlen	1–6, 8–9, 13–15
Team KTM UK	KTM	24	(United Kingdom) Shaun Simpson	1–11, 13–15
Team KTM UK	KTM	31	(United Kingdom) Alex Snow	6, 14–15
NGS Honda	Honda	25	(France) Marvin Musquin	1–12, 15
NGS Honda	Honda	85	(France) Mickael Musquin	1–7
Ricci Racing Yamaha	Yamaha	28	(Italy) Roberto Lombrici	2–5, 8, 15
Ricci Racing Yamaha	Yamaha	39	(Italy) Davide Guarneri	1–4, 8–15
Ricci Racing Yamaha	Yamaha	131	(France) Nicolas Aubin	All
Team Sturm Kawasaki	Kawasaki	32	(Germany) Robert Sturm	1–5, 7–8, 11–13, 15
Team Sturm Kawasaki	Kawasaki	42	(United States) Bradley Graham	1–2, 7–8
Champ KTM	KTM	34	(Belgium) Joel Roelants	1–4, 6–15
Champ KTM	KTM	43	(Spain) Francisco José Millan	2–3, 7, 9, 11
Champ KTM	KTM	89	(Belgium) Jeremy van Horebeek	1–5, 7–15
Red Bull De Carli Yamaha	Yamaha	36	(Italy) Matteo Bonini	4–8, 13–15
Red Bull De Carli Yamaha	Yamaha	222	(Italy) Tony Cairoli	1–10
Red Bull De Carli Yamaha	Yamaha	501	(Italy) Alessandro Lupino	All
Favor KTM Motorsport	KTM	37	(Estonia) Gert Krestinov	1–9, 11–15
Suzuki Swift Motocross Team	Suzuki	44	(United Kingdom) Elliott Banks-Browne	1–7, 9–15
Suzuki Swift Motocross Team	Suzuki	45	(United Kingdom) Jake Nicholls	4, 6–15
Suzuki Swift Motocross Team	Suzuki	47	(France) Pascal Leuret	1, 8–11
Van Beers Racing Yamaha	Yamaha	56	(Russia) Evgeny Bobryshev	1–2, 4, 7–9, 12, 14–15
Bud Racing Kawasaki	Kawasaki	64	(France) Khounsith Vongsana	1–5, 11–15
Bud Racing Kawasaki	Kawasaki	100	(Australia) Brenden Harrison	1
Bud Racing Kawasaki	Kawasaki	110	(France) Luigi Seguy	7
Shineray MX China	Yamaha	75	(Belgium) Dennis Verbruggen	3–9, 11–12, 14
Shineray MX China	Yamaha	165	(Belgium) Nick Triest	2, 11–12, 14–15
Shineray MX China	Yamaha	175	(Belgium) Jurgen Wybo	1
Beursfoon Suzuki	Suzuki	77	(South Africa) Shannon Terreblanche	1–8
Beursfoon Suzuki	Suzuki	80	(Netherlands) Erik Eggens	1–5, 11, 14
Silver Action KTM	KTM	81	(France) Jeremy Tarroux	1–13, 15
Yamaha Van Vijfeijken	Yamaha	86	(Netherlands) Rob van Vijfeijken	1–6, 11–15
Teka Suzuki	Suzuki	111	(Belarus) Evgeni Tyletski	1–5, 7–9, 11–12, 14
Inotec Suzuki	Suzuki	121	(France) Xavier Boog	All
Wild Card Teams & Riders
Team	Constructor	No	Rider	Rounds
	Suzuki	33	(Slovakia) Tomáš Šimko	1–2, 7–9, 11
Ricci Junior Racing	Yamaha	38	(Norway) Kjetil Gundersen	1
Hard Racing Team	Kawasaki	53	(Portugal) Paulo Alberto	3
MXM Crimafil Racing Team	KTM	54	(Portugal) Nelson Silva	3
	Suzuki	55	(Netherlands) Mike Kras	1–4
	Kawasaki	57	(Portugal) Nuno Gonçalves	3
	KTM	58	(Greece) Vasilis Zachariou	4
	Suzuki	59	(Bulgaria) Nikolay Kolev	4
Sigi Bauer Racing Team	KTM	63	(Austria) Matthias Walkner	5, 12
Brouwer Motorsport Team	KTM	66	(Latvia) Aigars Bobkovs	11–12, 14
DB Honda	Honda	74	(South Africa) Neville Bradshaw	6
Schmierstoff MX Team	Honda	87	(Austria) Günter Schmidinger	8, 12
Yamaha Sweden	Yamaha	90	(Sweden) Tom Söderström	9
Vangani Racing	Honda	91	(Latvia) Matiss Karro	1, 4–5, 8–9, 11, 14–15
Kölling Yamaha	Yamaha	92	(Czech Republic) Petr Smitka	8, 12
CH Racing Husqvarna	Husqvarna	101	(France) Antoine Méo	15
Nestaan Jumbo Team	Honda	104	(Netherlands) Herjan Brakke	11
Nestaan Jumbo Team	Honda	122	(Netherlands) Jan van Hastenberg	14
Sarholz KTM	KTM	108	(Portugal) Joaquim Rodrigues	1–2, 7, 9
Smitma-Paez Racing	Honda	109	(Netherlands) Jordi Paez Dominguez	11, 14
Star Motor MX Team	Honda	116	(Norway) Remi Nyegaard	5, 9
	Honda	130	(South Africa) Merik Sparg	10
PAR Homes Honda	Honda	133	(United Kingdom) Ashley Greedy	6–7
	Kawasaki	134	(South Africa) Ross Branch	10
	Yamaha	136	(South Africa) Wesley de Jager	10
TKM Kneip Racing Team	KTM	138	(South Africa) Michael Kok	10
	KTM	139	(South Africa) Ryan Angilley	10
	Yamaha	142	(South Africa) Angelo Picoto	10
	Suzuki	144	(South Africa) Grant Frerichs	10
	Honda	145	(South Africa) Leeroy Emslie	10
VMK Racing KTM	KTM	151	(Finland) Harri Kullas	14–15
Van De Wetering Suzuki	Suzuki	159	(Netherlands) Glenn Coldenhoff	14
Gariboldi Racing	Yamaha	171	(Spain) José Butrón	15
Kaduuz Racing	Suzuki	175	(Denmark) Nikolaj Larsen	8
Van Der Haar KTM	KTM	185	(Netherlands) Rinus van de Ven	1–3, 14
	KTM	200	(Switzerland) Arnaud Tonus	7, 12
	Yamaha	208	(Bulgaria) Gancho Georgiev	4
Team Martin Honda Europe	Honda	245	(Italy) Michele de Bortoli	15
Suzuki International Junior	Suzuki	291	(Sweden) Filip Thuresson	8–9
	Kawasaki	311	(United States) Teddy Maier	13
MD Racing	Yamaha	412	(France) Cedric Soubeyras	7–8
MD Racing	Yamaha	430	(France) Christophe Charlier	7–8
Team Green Kawasaki	Kawasaki	519	(France) Loic Rombaut	7, 12

=== Riders' Championship ===
Pos	Rider	Manufacturer	NED (Netherlands)		ESP (Spain)		POR (Portugal)		BUL (Bulgaria)		ITA (Italy)		GBR (United Kingdom)		FRA (France)		GER (Germany)		SWE (Sweden)		RSA (South Africa)		BEL (Belgium)		CZE (Czech Republic)		IRL (Republic of Ireland)		BEN (Benelux)		ITA (Italy)		Points
1	(South Africa) Rattray	KTM	1	1	1	17	3	2	3	5	3	2	1	4	6	2	2	1	1	3	3	1	1	10	1	2	2	1	1	1	2	4	636
2	(United Kingdom) Searle	KTM	3	5	10	8	2	3	2	1	2	3	3	2	1	1	3	9	6	4	1	2	2	6	2	1	4	2	2	2	1	1	613
3	(France) Aubin	Yamaha	9	6	7	15	8	4	13	3	1	6	9	Ret	5	10	Ret	18	5	20	2	5	12	2	3	6	3	7	4	3	9	8	406
4	(United Kingdom) Simpson	KTM	5	9	9	14	21	8	11	2	7	4	4	7	17	4	5	6	3	2	4	4	5	12			6	11	6	6	6	9	394
5	(Portugal) R. Gonçalves	KTM	6	4	Ret	4	6	6	10	7	5	11	10	16	16	11	6	3	7	6	11	17	3	4	8	10	10	8	3	4	23	6	380
6	(Italy) Cairoli	Yamaha	2	2	2	11	1	1	1	19	4	1	2	1	Ret	3	1	2	2	1	Ret	Ret											357
7	(France) Boog	Suzuki	8	8	11	12	11	Ret	7	4	9	Ret	16	6	4	7	12	8	12	Ret	6	7	20	9	10	11	9	9	7	Ret	11	7	307
8	(Belgium) van Horebeek	KTM	7	14	19	9	10	10	9	8	8	7			10	Ret	7	7	9	11	9	6	6	3	Ret	9	12	Ret	8	10	5	15	299
9	(United Kingdom) Sword	Kawasaki	Ret	7	4	7	4	5	4	Ret	6	Ret	6	5	14	Ret					10	13	13	21	4	5	8	4	15	13	4	5	291
10	(France) Frossard	Kawasaki	Ret	Ret	12	Ret	7	Ret	Ret	Ret	10	5	15	3	Ret	5	4	4	4	7	5	3	7	16	6	4	5	3	16	Ret			289
11	(Italy) Monni	Yamaha	19	12	6	2	Ret	9	12	11	12	12	7	13	9	19	8	10	11	16	13	14	11	15	11	8	13	10	13	15	14	10	277
12	(France) Boissière	KTM	12	Ret	Ret	Ret	13	16	8	6	16	13	5	9	3	6	13	21	18	12	Ret	9	15	11	5	3	7	5	18	DNS	3	Ret	263
13	(Belgium) Roelants	KTM	10	10	16	5	16	20	25	16			17	11	19	18	11	11	21	15	Ret	Ret	4	5	7	20	19	6	5	Ret	8	2	216
14	(France) Musquin	Honda	Ret	Ret	8	18	14	Ret	6	12	13	Ret	13	10	8	9	10	5	14	8	7	8	Ret	22	14	Ret					16	17	189
15	(Italy) Guarneri	Yamaha	15	11	3	1	5	12	Ret	10							19	23	10	17	8	15	9	13	Ret	7	Ret	Ret	17	11	Ret	DNS	181
16	(France) Tarroux	KTM	11	Ret	5	Ret	26	13	17	22	15	19	Ret	8	2	13	15	13	13	5	17	12	Ret	Ret	9	12	Ret	DNS			Ret	13	169
17	(Estonia) Krestinov	KTM	13	16	21	13	23	19	DNQ	DNQ	17	16	24	18	22	Ret	DNQ	DNQ	22	22			8	1	17	18	17	13	12	5	Ret	20	118
18	(United Kingdom) Nunn	Suzuki	Ret	22	14	Ret	15	7	21	13	19	10	Ret	15	DNQ	Ret	17	14	20	14			DNQ	DNQ	16	14	11	17	DNQ	18	12	14	118
19	(France) Aranda	Kawasaki	DNQ	DNQ	17	16	18	15	15	9	14	Ret	12	17	7	8	23	Ret	Ret	10	14	Ret	DNQ	DNQ									101
20	(Finland) Seistola	Honda	DNS	DNS					22	Ret	23	14	Ret	23	DNQ	DNQ	21	12	8	13			10	7	24	13	Ret	DNS	14	12	Ret	11	96
21	(France) Paulin	Kawasaki	22	15	Ret	3	9	11	5	24	11	9	23	12																			95
22	(United States) Osborne	Yamaha																					Ret	8	Ret	16	1	Ret	24	Ret	7	3	77
23	(Italy) Lupino	Yamaha	DNQ	DNQ	15	Ret	19	21	26	DNS	20	20	18	Ret	DNQ	17	27	19	23	23	15	16	22	19	12	17	16	16	DNQ	DNQ	10	12	75
24	(Russia) Bobryshev	Yamaha	23	20	13	10			24	21					18	16	16	15	24	18					22	Ret			11	7	21	16	71
25	(South Africa) Avis	Honda	18	Ret	22	Ret	12	Ret	Ret	18	DNQ	DNQ	11	20	Ret	15	9	Ret	Ret	9	Ret	Ret	Ret	DNS									56
26	(Netherlands) Eggens	Suzuki	4	3	Ret	Ret	Ret	DNS	Ret	Ret	Ret	8											24	Ret					Ret	Ret			51
27	(Italy) Bonini	Yamaha							19	17	22	15	8	22	Ret	DNS	Ret	Ret									14	12	21	16	Ret	19	48
28	(United Kingdom) Dougan	Suzuki	DNQ	DNQ	18	Ret	DNQ	DNQ	14	14	Ret	18	Ret	DNS	11	Ret	26	22	15	19			17	Ret	15	Ret	Ret	Ret					48
29	(United Kingdom) Nicholls	Suzuki							DNQ	DNQ			DNQ	DNQ	DNQ	DNQ	DNQ	DNQ	19	21	16	11	19	18	13	21	Ret	14	DNQ	DNQ	17	21	41
30	(France) Leuret	Suzuki	16	DNS													14	17	Ret	DNS	12	10	DNQ	DNQ									36
31	(United Kingdom) Banks-Browne	Suzuki	DNQ	DNQ	Ret	20	17	18	18	25	Ret	17	19	Ret	Ret	DNS			Ret	DNS	20	Ret	DNQ	DNQ	Ret	15	18	15	26	Ret	DNQ	DNQ	33
32	(South Africa) Swanepoel	Kawasaki																									Ret	Ret	10	9	13	Ret	31
33	(Latvia) Karro	Honda	DNQ	DNQ					DNQ	DNQ	DNQ	DNQ					DNQ	DNQ	DNQ	Ret			23	Ret					9	8	DNQ	DNQ	25
34	(South Africa) Terreblance	Suzuki	21	21	DNQ	DNQ	20	14	20	15	DNQ	DNQ	14	24	Ret	Ret	24	Ret															22
35	(France) Larrieu	Kawasaki													12	12																	18
36	(Belgium) Verbruggen	Yamaha					DNQ	Ret	DNQ	DNQ	21	Ret	20	Ret	DNQ	DNQ	18	16	25	Ret			Ret	14	Ret	Ret			Ret	DNS			16
37	(Netherlands) van Vijfeijken	Yamaha	20	17	DNQ	DNQ	24	22	DNQ	DNQ	DNQ	DNQ	DNQ	DNQ									Ret	17	21	22	23	21	23	14	DNQ	DNQ	16
38	(Italy) Pellegrini	Honda	25	Ret	Ret	6	DNQ	DNQ	DNQ	DNQ	Ret	Ret	DNQ	21	DNQ	DNQ	28	Ret															15
39	(Netherlands) van de Ven	KTM	14	18	DNQ	DNQ	DNQ	DNQ																					22	17			14
40	(France) Rombaut	Kawasaki													13	Ret									18	19							13
41	(France) Seguy	Kawasaki													15	14																	13
42	(France) Vanni	KTM			Ret	Ret	25	17	23	20	DNQ	DNQ	21	14																			12
43	(Sweden) Norlen	Suzuki	24	19	DNQ	DNQ	DNQ	DNQ	DNQ	DNQ	DNQ	DNQ	DNQ	DNQ			DNQ	DNQ	DNQ	DNQ							20	18	DNQ	DNQ	19	18	11
44	(Italy) Philippaerts	Yamaha	DNQ	DNQ	DNQ	DNQ	Ret	Ret	DNQ	DNQ	24	Ret	DNQ	DNQ	20	20	DNQ	DNQ	DNQ	DNQ	18	19	21	24	DNQ	DNQ	21	20	DNQ	DNQ	18	Ret	11
45	(Netherlands) Kras	Suzuki	Ret	13	DNQ	DNQ	DNQ	DNQ	DNQ	DNQ																							8
46	(France) Vongsana	Kawasaki	DNQ	DNQ	DNQ	DNQ	22	Ret	16	23	18	Ret											DNQ	DNQ	Ret	Ret	Ret	Ret	DNQ	DNQ	DNQ	DNQ	8
47	(Spain) Millan	KTM			DNQ	DNQ	DNQ	DNQ							DNQ	DNQ			DNQ	DNQ			14	Ret									7
48	(United Kingdom) Barr	Yamaha	DNQ	DNQ									Ret	Ret			DNQ	DNQ	DNQ	DNQ							15	Ret					6
49	(Slovenia) Gerčar	Yamaha																													15	Ret	6
50	(Netherlands) Brakke	Honda																					16	20									6
51	(Sweden) Thuresson	Suzuki															DNQ	DNQ	16	24													5
52	(South Africa) Kok	KTM																			19	18											5
53	(Belarus) Tyletski	Suzuki	DNQ	DNQ	DNQ	DNQ	DNQ	DNQ	DNQ	DNQ	25	Ret			DNQ	DNQ	22	25	17	25			DNQ	DNQ	DNQ	DNQ			27	22			4
54	(Portugal) Rodrigues	KTM	17	23	Ret	DNS									DNQ	DNQ			DNQ	DNQ													4
55	(Netherlands) Domínguez	Honda																					18	23					DNQ	DNQ			3
56	(Netherlands) van Hastenberg	Honda																											20	19			3
57	(Finland) Kullas	KTM																											19	20	DNQ	DNQ	3
58	(United States) Maier	Kawasaki																									22	19					2
59	(South Africa) Bradshaw	Honda											22	19																			2
60	(Austria) Schmidinger	Honda															DNQ	DNQ							19	Ret							2
61	(Slovakia) Šimko	Suzuki	DNQ	DNQ	DNQ	19									DNQ	DNQ	DNQ	DNQ	DNQ	DNQ			DNQ	DNQ									2
62	(France) Mi.Musquin	Honda	DNQ	DNQ	20	Ret	DNQ	DNQ	DNQ	Ret	DNQ	DNQ	25	Ret	21	Ret																	1
63	(France) Soubeyras	Yamaha													23	Ret	25	20															1
64	(Denmark) Larsen	Suzuki															20	24															1
65	(France) Méo	Husqvarna																													20	Ret	1
66	(Czech Republic) Smitka	Yamaha															DNQ	DNQ							20	Ret							1
67	(South Africa) Branch	Kawasaki																			Ret	20											1
	(South Africa) Picoto	Yamaha																			21	21	DNQ	DNQ									0
	(Netherlands) Coldenhoff	Suzuki																											25	21			0
	(France) Charlier	Yamaha													Ret	Ret	DNQ	DNQ															0
	(Norway) Nyegaard	Honda									Ret	21							DNQ	DNQ													0
	(South Africa) Angilley	KTM																			22	22											0
	(Spain) Butrón	Yamaha																													22	23	0
	(United Kingdom) Snow	KTM											DNQ	DNQ															DNQ	DNQ	DNQ	22	0
	(South Africa) Frerichs	Suzuki																			23	23											0
	(Latvia) Bobkovs	KTM																					DNQ	DNQ	DNQ	DNQ			Ret	Ret			0
	(Austria) Walkner	KTM									DNQ	DNQ													23	Ret							0
	(Italy) Lombrici	Yamaha			DNQ	DNQ	DNQ	DNQ	DNQ	DNQ	DNQ	DNQ					DNQ	DNQ													24	24	0
	(South Africa) Sparg	Honda																			DNS	24											0
	(South Africa) Emsley	Honda																			Ret	DNS											0
	(Belgium) Dierckx	Honda			DNQ	DNQ	Ret	Ret	DNQ	DNQ	DNQ	DNQ	DNQ	DNQ	DNQ	DNQ	DNQ	DNQ	DNQ	Ret			DNQ	Ret									0
	(South Africa) de Jager	Yamaha																			Ret	Ret											0
	(United Kingdom) Pocock	Yamaha					DNQ	DNQ	DNQ	DNQ	DNQ	DNQ	DNQ	DNQ	DNQ	DNQ	DNQ	DNQ	DNQ	DNQ							DNQ	Ret	DNQ	DNQ			0
	(Sweden) Soderstrom	Yamaha																	Ret	Ret													0
	(Italy) De Bortoli	Honda																													Ret	Ret	0
	(Germany) Sturm	Kawasaki	DNQ	DNQ	DNQ	DNQ	DNQ	DNQ	DNQ	DNQ	DNQ	DNQ			DNQ	DNQ	DNQ	DNQ					DNQ	DNQ	DNQ	DNQ	DNQ	DNQ			DNQ	DNQ	0
	(Belgium) Triest	Yamaha			DNQ	DNQ																	DNQ	DNQ	DNQ	DNQ			DNQ	DNQ	DNQ	DNQ	0
	(United States) Graham	Kawasaki	DNQ	DNQ	DNQ	DNQ									DNQ	DNQ	DNQ	DNQ															0
	(Italy) Fiorgentili	Honda	DNQ	DNQ	DNQ	DNQ	DNQ	DNQ																									0
	(United Kingdom) Greedy	Honda											DNQ	DNQ	DNQ	DNQ																	0
	(Switzerland) Tonus	KTM													DNQ	DNQ									DNQ	DNQ							0
	(Norway) Gundersen	Yamaha	DNQ	DNQ																													0
	(Belgium) Wybo	Yamaha	DNQ	DNQ																													0
	(Spain) Campano	Yamaha	DNQ	DNQ																													0
	(Australia) Harrison	Kawasaki	DNQ	DNQ																													0
	(Portugal) Alberto	Kawasaki					DNQ	DNQ																									0
	(Portugal) Silva	KTM					DNQ	DNQ																									0
	(Portugal) N.Goncalves	Kawasaki					DNQ	DNQ																									0
	(Bulgaria) Kolev	Suzuki							DNQ	DNQ																							0
	(Greece) Zachariou	KTM							DNQ	DNQ																							0
	(Bulgaria) Georgiev	Yamaha							DNQ	DNQ																							0
	(Italy) Martini	Suzuki									DNQ	DNQ																					0
	(Slovakia) Maca	Suzuki									DNQ	DNQ																					0
	(United Kingdom) Gregory	Suzuki											DNQ	DNQ																			0
	(United Kingdom) Philips	KTM											DNQ	DNQ																			0
	(Germany) Jache	Kawasaki															DNQ	DNQ															0
	(Sweden) Dahlgren	Honda																	DNQ	DNQ													0
	(Sweden) Akerblom	Suzuki																	DNQ	DNQ													0
	(Sweden) Sandberg	Kawasaki																	DNQ	DNQ													0
	(Sweden) Eriksson	Suzuki																	DNQ	DNQ													0
	(Norway) Lunewski	Suzuki																	DNQ	DNQ													0
	(Norway) Fuglerud	KTM																	DNQ	DNQ													0
	(South Africa) Buys	Kawasaki																			DNQ	DNQ											0
	(Italy) De Luca	Honda																			DNQ	DNQ											0
	(South Africa) Wheeler	Suzuki																			DNQ	DNQ											0
	(South Africa) Frerichs	Suzuki																			DNQ	DNQ											0
	(South Africa) Visagie	Suzuki																			DNQ	DNQ											0
	(Zimbabwe) Thixton	Yamaha																			DNQ	DNQ											0
	(South Africa) Gildenhuys	KTM																			DNQ	DNQ											0
	(Zimbabwe) Jardim	KTM																			DNQ	DNQ											0
	(Zambia) Lionnet	Honda																			DNQ	DNQ											0
	(Kenya) Vinayak	Yamaha																			DNQ	DNQ											0
	(Belgium) Vandueren	KTM																					DNQ	DNQ									0
	(Belgium) Wouts	Honda																					DNQ	DNQ									0
	(Belgium) Rau	KTM																					DNQ	DNQ									0
	(Slovakia) Kohut	KTM																							DNQ	DNQ							0
	(Czech Republic) Spacek	Suzuki																							DNQ	DNQ							0
	(France) Billerey	Yamaha																							DNQ	DNQ							0
	(Austria) A. Schmidinger	Honda																							DNQ	DNQ							0
	(United Kingdom) Hamilton	Yamaha																									DNQ	DNQ					0
	(United Kingdom) Leonard	Honda																									DNQ	DNQ					0
	(Philippines) San Andres	Kawasaki																									DNQ	DNQ					0
	(Netherlands) Reijnders	Suzuki																											DNQ	DNQ			0
	(United Kingdom) Carless	Honda																											DNQ	DNQ			0
	(Italy) Bertuzzo	Yamaha																													DNQ	DNQ	0
	(Italy) Moroni	Yamaha																													DNQ	DNQ	0
	(Italy) Redondi	Suzuki																													DNQ	DNQ	0

=== Manufacturers' Championship ===
Pos	Manufacturer	Points
1	(Austria) KTM	716
2	(Japan) Yamaha	631
3	(Japan) Kawasaki	464
4	(Japan) Suzuki	371
5	(Japan) Honda	277
6	(Sweden) Husqvarna	1

== MX3 ==
=== Riders' Championship ===
Pos	Rider	Manufacturer	ESP (Spain)		FRA (France)		ITA (Italy)		FRA (France)		POR (Portugal)		ESP (Spain)		CRO (Croatia)		BUL (Bulgaria)		NED (Netherlands)		SLO (Slovenia)		SVK (Slovakia)		CHL (Chile)		FIN (Finland)		DEN (Denmark)		SUI (Switzerland)		GER (Germany)		Points
1	(Belgium) Sven Breugelmans	KTM	4	2	2	2	2	16	3	1	1	4	Ret	3	2	C	7	10	2	1	4	3	15	Ret	5	12	1	1	1	1	1	3	7	Ret	541
2	(Italy) Christian Beggi	Honda	6	3	3	4	1	1	4	3	2	3	4	7	1	C	9	6	3	4	24	18	10	8	3	1	3	8	4	8	6	4	4	3	532
3	(France) Christophe Martin	Husqvarna	2	7	Ret	Ret	7	4	7	4	Ret	2	3	4	9	C	3	1	5	5	2	4	2	3	2	3	2	5	12	3	4	5	1	1	524
4	(France) Thomas Allier	Husqvarna	3	1	Ret	Ret	9	17	1	7	5	1	14	Ret	3	C	1	3	1	Ret	17	Ret	1	2	1	Ret	20	Ret	Ret	11	5	8	3	Ret	374
5	(Spain) Álvaro Lozano Rico	KTM	5	Ret	5	6	5	3	8	16	Ret	DNS									7	7	5	9	8	2	8	9	2	2	2	1	2	2	352
6	(Belgium) Jonas Salaets	Honda	8	11	8	8	12	12	13	6	3	6	11	10	4	C	2	11	9	19	8	Ret	12	7	18	11	10	15	Ret	Ret	12	Ret	Ret	8	298
7	(Czech Republic) Martin Žerava	Honda	11	6	6	9	11	13	24	8	DNS	DNS			6	C	4	4	16	Ret	16	Ret	4	5	10	7	7	Ret	17	14	7	7	8	5	285
8	(Belgium) Patrick Caps	Kawasaki	9	4	7	5	8	8	6	5	Ret	5	13	5	Ret	C			7	Ret	6	5	6	1							Ret	6	5	Ret	273
9	(Denmark) Nicolai Hansen	Yamaha	17	Ret	9	14	Ret	Ret	14	14	7	9	6	9	11	C	17	Ret	13	8	9	22	20	14	6	9	9	7	8	7	8	10	9	14	268
10	(Denmark) Kasper Jensen	Honda	23	14	11	13	13	14	10	18	DNS	DNS			Ret	C	11	7	17	9	10	11	11	12	4	5	11	Ret	Ret	10	10	13	13	9	228
11	(Finland) Antti Pyrhönen	Suzuki																	6	6	11	Ret	8	11			4	3	3	5	3	2	6	4	212
12	(Slovenia) Saso Kragelj	Yamaha					Ret	6							14	C	5	2			3	1	14	4							9	9	Ret	6	169
13	(Czech Republic) Jan Zaremba	KTM	1	5	4	3	6	2	9	9																									140
14	(Czech Republic) Martin Michek	Honda	10	12	15	11	3	11							26	C			10	7	5	Ret	3	10											138
15	(Spain) Adrian Garrido	Yamaha	15	8			15	10	Ret	11	13	10	5	6	22	C	10	8																	120
16	(Italy) Daniele Bricca	Honda	Ret	DNS			10	7	11	10	6	Ret	10	12	19	C	12	5																	108
17	(Russia) Vitali Tonkov	Yamaha	14	9	12	21	20	Ret	12	13	12	12	9	17																			11	21	90
18	(Italy) Stefano Dami	Honda	7	17	10	7	4	5																											77
19	(Latvia) Ivo Steinbergs	Honda	13	28	25	22	17	9			8	11	19	15	12	C	20	13	27	25	20	Ret	25	21											74
20	(Croatia) Nenad Sipek	Yamaha	16	10	14	10	19	Ret							Ret	C	8	Ret			23	Ret	17	17							Ret	14			64
21	(Belgium) Tom de Belder	Honda					22	21	19	19	18	15	16	Ret	18	C	6	9	11	16	22	20	22	DNS											64
22	(Portugal) Luis Correia	Suzuki									4	7	17	8									7	20											64
23	(Italy) Fabio Torsiello	Honda													10	C	18	15	DNQ	DNQ	29	16	Ret	27	14	14	23	20	Ret	22	Ret	15	19	15	54
24	(Spain) Jonathan Barragan	KTM											1	1																					50
25	(Belgium) Yentel Martens	KTM									Ret	Ret	23	22	8	C	Ret	Ret	Ret	18	33	9	28	Ret			18	17	14	17	17	Ret	22	Ret	50
26	(France) Sebastien Pourcel	Kawasaki			1	1																													50
27	(Finland) Tommi Mäkinen	Honda																									12	6	7	12					47
28	(Italy) Alex Salvini	Suzuki																			1	2													47
29	(France) Cyrille Coulon	Yamaha							2	2																									44
30	(Spain) Carlos Campano	Yamaha											2	2																					44
31	(Netherlands) William Saris	Yamaha																	Ret	11									5	4					44
32	(Netherlands) Patrick Roos	KTM													15	C			8	2															41
33	(Belgium) Michael Besonhe	Kawasaki	Ret	22	19	Ret	DNS	DNS	26	21	Ret	14	20	14	16	C	14	Ret	20	Ret	25	15	16	Ret											41
34	(Latvia) Davis Livs	Yamaha																	15	10							14	10	Ret	15					41
35	(Netherlands) Bas Verhoeven	Honda																	4	3															38
36	(Italy) Martino Vestri	KTM	21	Ret	20	15	Ret	18	Ret	Ret	11	13	Ret	20	13	C			26	Ret			Ret	30											37
37	(Estonia) Gert Krestinov	KTM																									6	2							37
38	(Finland) Jussi Nikkila	Yamaha	20	Ret	21	16	Ret	20																			15	14	10	16					36
39	(Sweden) Kim Lindström	KTM																									16	12	15	6					35
40	(Finland) Juha Salminen	KTM																									5	4							34
41	(France) Raphael Beaudouin	Suzuki	Ret	16	17	12	21	Ret	16	12																									32
42	(Austria) Michael Staufer	KTM							5	Ret					5	C																			32
43	(Germany) Dennis Schröter	KTM					Ret	19	17	17									12	22													18	12	31
44	(Belgium) Jan Lauryssen	Honda																	Ret	Ret	36	Ret	31	31					Ret	9			12	11	31
45	(Chile) Pablo Quintanilla	Honda																							7	6									29
46	(Belgium) Adri Vandersanden	Honda	25	30			Ret	30	25	20	17	16	26	Ret	Ret	C	13	14	18	Ret	26	24	30	Ret											28
47	(Sweden) Rasmus Sjöberg	KTM	27	23	27	29													23	24							17	Ret	11	23	13	20	16	Ret	28
48	(Portugal) Hugo Santos	Suzuki									10	8	21	19																					26
49	(Croatia) Marko Leljak	KTM													20	C					12	6	Ret	25							Ret	Ret			25
50	(Chile) Benjamin Israel	Honda																							9	8									25
51	(Bulgaria) Nikolay Kumanov	Yamaha			32	27	24	24							Ret	C	15	12			Ret	12	Ret	24											24
52	(Netherlands) Jan van Hastenberg	Honda	29	20	28	19			18	28			18	16					Ret	12															23
53	(Austria) Oswald Reisinger	Suzuki													7	C							19	15											22
54	(Spain) Xavier Hernandez	Yamaha											8	13																					21
55	(Czech Republic) Frantisek Maca	Kawasaki																			13	8	21	Ret											21
56	(Spain) Alexander Elgh	Yamaha									16	Ret	22	Ret											13	13									21
57	(Chile) Vicente Israel	Honda																							11	10									21
58	(Denmark) Allan Scheel Hansen																												9	13					20
59	(Sweden) Max Nyberg	Honda					Ret	29	21	Ret																	19	13	DNS	DNS	21	11			20
60	(Slovakia) Tomas Simko	Suzuki																					9	13											20
61	(France) Medric Demeure	KTM					28	32	28	25									29	Ret											11	12			19
62	(Spain) Maxim Lesage	Honda											12	11																					19
63	(Czech Republic) Jiri Cepelak	Yamaha																					18	6											18
64	(Argentina) Sebastian Sanchez	Honda																							Ret	4									18
65	(Spain) Raul Alvarez	Yamaha	12	13																															17
66	(Sweden) Bjorn Andersson	Kawasaki			23	17																					21	16	13	Ret					17
67	(Germany) Andreas Huber	KTM																															15	10	17
68	(Belgium) Frederic Weigert	Honda																	22	17											16	16	Ret	19	16
69	(Portugal) Rui Rodrigues	Yamaha									19	19									14	Ret	24	16											16
70	(Portugal) Hugo Basaula	Suzuki									9	17																							16
71	(France) Maxime Emery	Kawasaki	Ret	Ret	18	Ret			15	15																									15
72	(Slovenia) Jaka Moze	Suzuki													Ret	C					15	14	Ret	19											15
73	(Denmark) Bo Vang Jensen																												6	Ret					15
74	(Germany) Steffen Albrecht	Yamaha																															14	13	15
75	(Spain) Francisco Garcia Vico	Honda	Ret	Ret	DNS	DNS							7	Ret																					14
76	(United Kingdom) Aston Bird	Honda																	19	14									18	19					14
77	(Slovenia) Damjan Smrekar	Honda																			18	10													14
78	(Belarus) Evgeni Tyletski	Suzuki																															Ret	7	14
79	(France) Timotei Potisek	Honda							23	Ret									14	15															13
80	(Czech Republic) Vojtech Brumla	Kawasaki	24	Ret	22	Ret	Ret	22	Ret	Ret					DNS	C	16	16	Ret	23	27	Ret									23	18			13
81	(Slovakia) Tomas Bucenec	Honda	19	18																	28	Ret	13	Ret											13
82	(Venezuela) Michel Sandoval	Yamaha																							12	17									13
83	(Finland) Riku Rouhiainen	Yamaha																									Ret	19	20	24			17	16	12
84	(France) Alexandre Rouis	Kawasaki			13	18																													11
85	(Sweden) Johan Carlsson	Suzuki																															10	Ret	11
86	(Sweden) Andreas Hultman	Honda																									Ret	11							10
87	(United Kingdom) Jamie Law	Suzuki											15	18																					9
88	(Chile) Luciano Quintanilla	Honda																							17	16									9
89	(Spain) Ramon Brucart	Kawasaki			26	24			29	Ret	20	18	24	21							31	Ret	32	22							20	22	Ret	18	8
90	(Netherlands) Oscar Vromans	Yamaha																	Ret	13															8
91	(Chile) Felipe Otero	KTM																							16	18									8
92	(Chile) Daniel Gouet	Honda																							19	15									8
93	(Sweden) Robert Carlsson	Yamaha																									13	Ret							8
94	(Italy) Marcello Disetti	Kawasaki													23	C					Ret	13	29	26											8
95	(Italy) Andrea Bartolini	Husqvarna					14	Ret																											7
96	(Netherlands) Rob van Uden	Honda	26	26	Ret	30	DNS	DNS			14	21	Ret	Ret																					7
97	(Latvia) Philips Kemplis	Honda									22	Ret	27	23	Ret	C	22	19	28	26	Ret	19	Ret	29	20	19									7
98	(Czech Republic) Jan Brabec	Yamaha					Ret	15	20	23																									7
99	(Belgium) Emmanuel Hubert	Suzuki							32	24					25	C					21	Ret									14	29			7
100	(France) Johan Marillier	Kawasaki	Ret	15	Ret	Ret																													6
101	(Italy) Matteo Dottori	KTM	31	24	24	20	16	23																											6
102	(Denmark) Daniel Wozniak	Suzuki			31	Ret																							16	20					6
103	(Austria) Mario Hirschmugl	KTM													17	C					19	23	Ret	28											6
104	(Spain) Roger Oliva	Honda									15	Ret									34	Ret													6
105	(Venezuela) Fernando Macia	Yamaha																							15	Ret									6
106	(Switzerland) Johnny Lauper	Yamaha																													15	21			6
107	(Sweden) Jonas Bodin	Honda	18	19	29	23																													5
108	(France) Jeremy Tarroux	KTM			16	Ret																													5
109	(Italy) Antonio Tiveddu	Honda																															20	17	5
110	(Bulgaria) Todor Totev	Yamaha															19	18																	5
111	(Denmark) Simon Sorensen																												19	18					5
112	(Germany) Steffen Leopold	Suzuki																													18	19			5
113	(Greece) Stelios Galatianos	Honda															Ret	17																	4
114	(Slovakia) Bohuslav Radek	Yamaha																			30	17									29	27			4
115	(Switzerland) Alan Boechat	Honda																													Ret	17			4
116	(Austria) Manuel Obermayr	KTM																	21	Ret			23	18											3
117	(Italy) Manuel Beconcini	Honda					18	Ret																											3
118	(Finland) Kimmo Laakso	Honda																									24	18							3
119	(Spain) Jose Luis Martinez	Yamaha																											25	Ret	19	Ret	Ret	Ret	2
120	(Portugal) Carlos Alberto	Kawasaki									21	20	29	25																					1
121	(Belgium) Sven Wouters	Suzuki			DNS	31			DNQ	30	Ret	Ret	28	24	Ret	C	21	20	DNQ	DNQ															1
122	(Germany) Christoph Hanchen	Honda																	24	20															1
123	(Netherlands) Michel Visser	Yamaha																	Ret	27									Ret	25	28	28	21	20	1
124	(Uruguay) Sebastian Fernandez	Kawasaki																							21	20									1
	(Belgium) Dimitri Vanhoenacker	KTM			33	25			31	26					21	C					32	21													0
	(Denmark) Steffen Jansson	Yamaha																	DNQ	DNQ									21	21					0
	(Finland) Markus Jaakola	KTM																									22	21							0
	(Bulgaria) Boncho Avramov	KTM															23	21																	0
	(Chile) Aaron Avdaloff	Yamaha																							24	21									0
	(Italy) Simone Virdis	Honda	Ret	21	Ret	DNS																													0
	(Netherlands) Hans Vogels	Yamaha																	Ret	21															0
	(Belgium) Glenn Lambaerts	Suzuki													27	C	Ret	22	DNQ	DNQ															0
	(France) Laurent Brusset	Suzuki							27	22																									0
	(France) Alexandre Lefrancois	Kawasaki	22	Ret	30	28			Ret	29																									0
	(France) Romain Maurez	Husqvarna							Ret	Ret									DNQ	DNQ											22	Ret			0
	(France) Mike Luxembourger	Kawasaki							22	Ret																									0
	(Chile) Nicolas Tagle	Honda																							22	Ret									0
	(Chile) Mauricio Pinillos	Honda																							Ret	22									0
	(Finland) Sami Uski	Yamaha																									Ret	22							0
	(Sweden) Andreas Johansson	Honda																											22	Ret					0
	(Bulgaria) Peter Penev	KTM															24	23																	0
	(Italy) L. Malipensa	Kawasaki					23	26																											0
	(Hungary) Janos Borka	Kawasaki																					26	23											0
	(Denmark) Thomas Kongshoj																												23	26					0
	(Belgium) Cyril Maguet	Honda					29	Ret	30	27					Ret	C			DNQ	DNQ											27	23			0
	(Venezuela) Daniel Figueroa	Honda																							23	Ret									0
	(Luxembourg) Dennis Dictus	Yamaha	28	25					Ret	DNS									DNQ	DNQ											25	24			0
	(Austria) Philip Rüf	Honda																													24	25			0
	(Denmark) Kennet Hvam	KTM																	DNQ	DNQ									24	Ret					0
	(Switzerland) Patrick Walther	Yamaha													24	C			DNS	DNS															0
	(Italy) F. Maggiore	Honda					26	25																											0
	(France) Arnaud Demeester	Yamaha							Ret	Ret									25	29															0
	(Italy) Mirko Milani	KTM					25	31																											0
	(Spain) Txomin Arana	Yamaha											25	Ret																					0
	(Germany) Robert Sturm	Kawasaki																													26	26			0
	(France) Julien Mercadier	Honda	30	29	Ret	26			Ret	Ret																									0
	(Spain) Jesus Barragan	Kawasaki											Ret	26																					0
	(Italy) Fernando Benedini	Yamaha					27	28																											0
	(Spain) Ricardo Costas	Honda	Ret	27																															0
	(Italy) Alessandro Pagliacci	Honda					Ret	27																											0
	(Slovakia) Andrej Bilcik	Honda																					27	Ret											0
	(Switzerland) Jonathan Burn	Yamaha																	Ret	28															0
	(Switzerland) Vincent Hulmann	KTM																													30	31			0
	(France) Anthony Sarron	Yamaha																													31	30			0
	(Italy) R. Fappani	Suzuki					Ret	33																											0
	(Slovakia) Martin Toth	Yamaha																			35	Ret													0
	(Finland) Marko Kovalainen	KTM																	Ret	Ret			Ret	Ret			Ret	DNS					Ret	DNS	0
	(Italy) Simone Ricci	Suzuki	Ret	Ret	Ret	DNS																													0
	(Netherlands) Nick Tuin	Honda																	Ret	Ret															0
	(Slovenia) Erik Slavec	Honda																			Ret	Ret													0
	(Sweden) Jonny Lindhe	KTM																											Ret	Ret					0
	(Croatia) Ivica Stefanac	Yamaha													Ret	C																			0
	(Croatia) Danko Braim	Yamaha													Ret	C																			0
	(Croatia) Goran Goricki	Yamaha													Ret	C																			0
	(Slovakia) Vladimir Poduska	Honda																					DNS	Ret											0
	(Argentina) Nicolas Roda	Honda																							Ret	DNS									0
	(Finland) Jukka Pirinen	Honda																									Ret	DNS							0
	(Finland) Eemi Mutikainen	Honda																									Ret	DNS							0
	(Denmark) Tonni Andersen	Suzuki																											Ret	DNS					0
	(Switzerland) Raphael Muller	Kawasaki																													Ret	DNS			0
	(Germany) Enrico Jache	Kawasaki																															Ret	DNS	0
	(Switzerland) Julien Bill	Honda							DNS	DNS																									0
	(Argentina) Ezequiel Fanello	Yamaha																							DNS	DNS									0
	(Uruguay) Roberto Diaz	Yamaha																							DNS	DNS									0
	(Chile) Omar Ledesma	Honda																							DNS	DNS									0
	(United Kingdom) Stephen Heighton	Honda																									DNS	DNS							0
	(Netherlands) Jeffrey Meurs	Kawasaki																	DNQ	DNQ															0
	(Netherlands) Vince Riechers	Yamaha																	DNQ	DNQ															0
	(Netherlands) Heikki Berg	KTM																	DNQ	DNQ															0
	(United Kingdom) Peter Redford	Honda																	DNQ	DNQ															0

=== Manufacturers' Championship ===
Pos	Manufacturer	Points
1	(Austria) KTM	646
2	(Japan) Honda	578
3	(Sweden) Husqvarna	572
4	(Japan) Yamaha	444
5	(Japan) Kawasaki	346
6	(Japan) Suzuki	278
