= Alpinestars =

Motorsport clothing company

- Type: Private
- Industry: Motorsport clothing Action sports clothing Casual clothing MXD
- Founded: 1963 (63 years ago)
- Founder: Sante Mazzarolo
- Headquarters: Asolo, Veneto, Italy
- Number of locations: 3 (2010)
- Key people: Gabriele Mazzarolo
- Divisions: Astars authentic ind
- Website: alpinestars.com

Alpinestars is an Italian motorsports and action sports safety equipment manufacturer based in Asolo, Italy. Its lines include specialized products for MotoGP, motocross, motorcycling, Formula One, World Rally Championship, WEC, V8 Supercars, NASCAR, mountain biking, and surfing, and motorsports-themed, non-sports clothing. The company has fashion design centers in Italy and California offering products for men, women and children.

== History ==
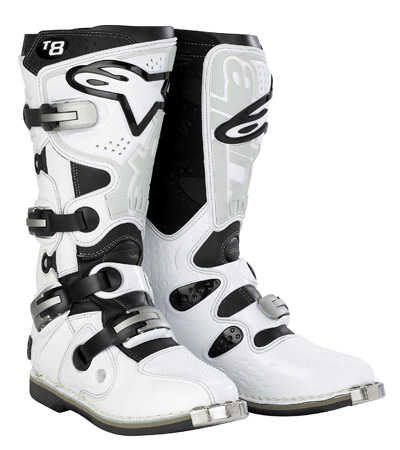
Alpinestars motocross boots

Founded in 1963 by Sante Mazzarolo in Asolo, Italy, the company started out making hiking and ski boots, but quickly shifted its focus to making motorcycle boots for motocross racing, and road racing boots shortly thereafter. The company's name comes from the English translation of the Italian mountain flower Stella Alpina (Edelweiss), which grows high in the mountains around the area where the company was founded. The company sponsored motorsport world champions such as Nicky Hayden, Roger DeCoster, Kenny Roberts, Mick Doohan and Marc Márquez. During the 1990s the company branched out into manufacturing all types of technical protective gear for motorcycling such as gloves, jackets, and full leather suits.

The company has been headed by Sante's son, Gabriele Mazzarolo, since 1993. There are offices in Los Angeles and Bangkok while the original headquarters and main research & development facility remain in Northern Italy.

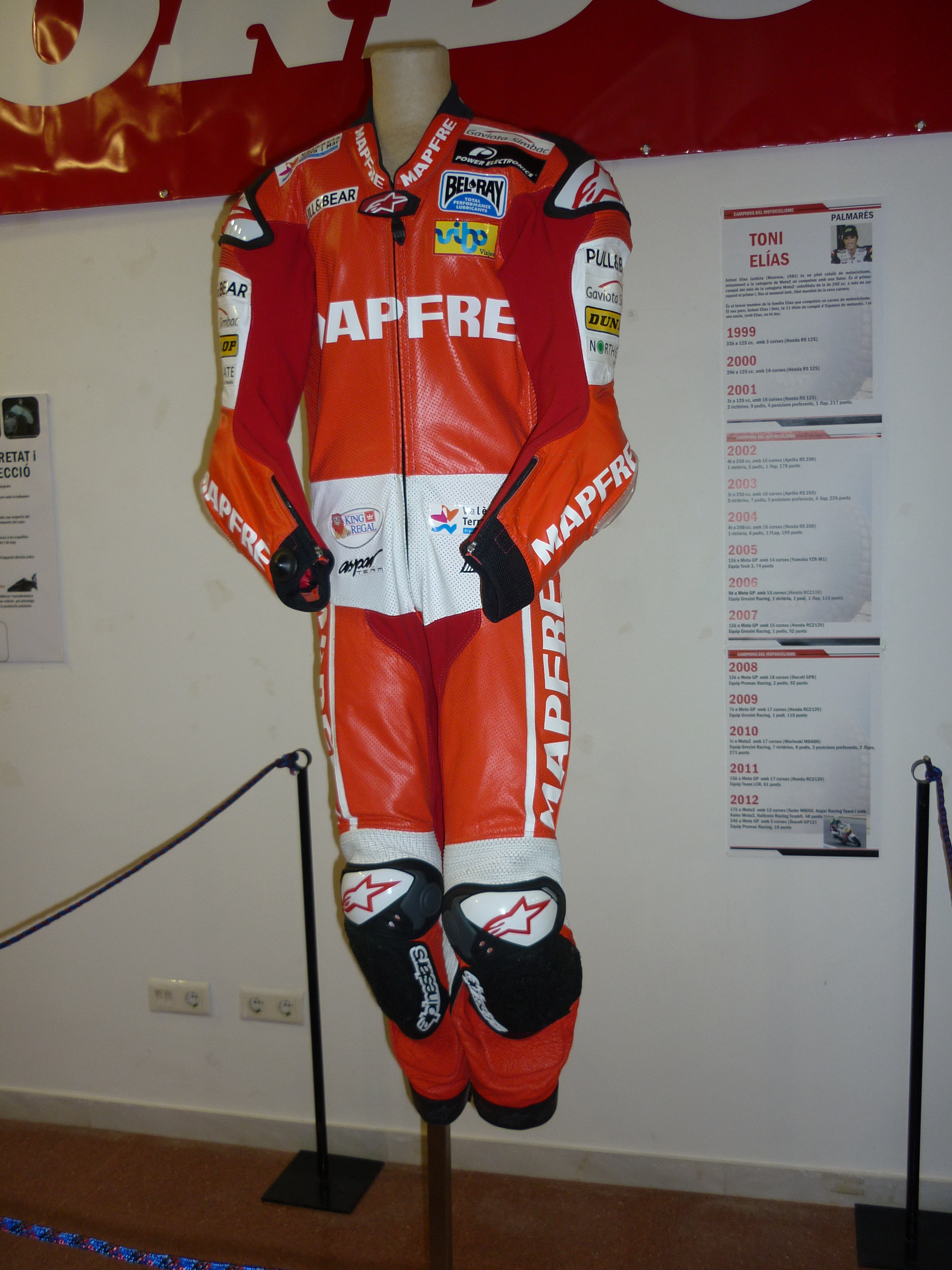
An Alpinestars racing suit

Alpinestars leather suits and protective gear are worn by MotoGP World Champions Marc Márquez, Casey Stoner and Jorge Lorenzo, and World Superbike Champions Ben Spies and Troy Corser. Alpinestars' motocross gear is used by AMA and World Motocross champions Marvin Musquin, Tyla Rattray, David Philippaerts, Christophe Pourcel, and Ryan Villopoto.

In 2011 Alpinestars developed the Tech Air Race System, an electronic airbag safety system that uses a data logging unit and dual charge inflation module. It was used in the MotoGP and World Superbike championships. In June 2013 Marc Márquez crashed at a speed of around 337 km/h (209 mph) while wearing the airbag suit and did not sustain serious injuries.

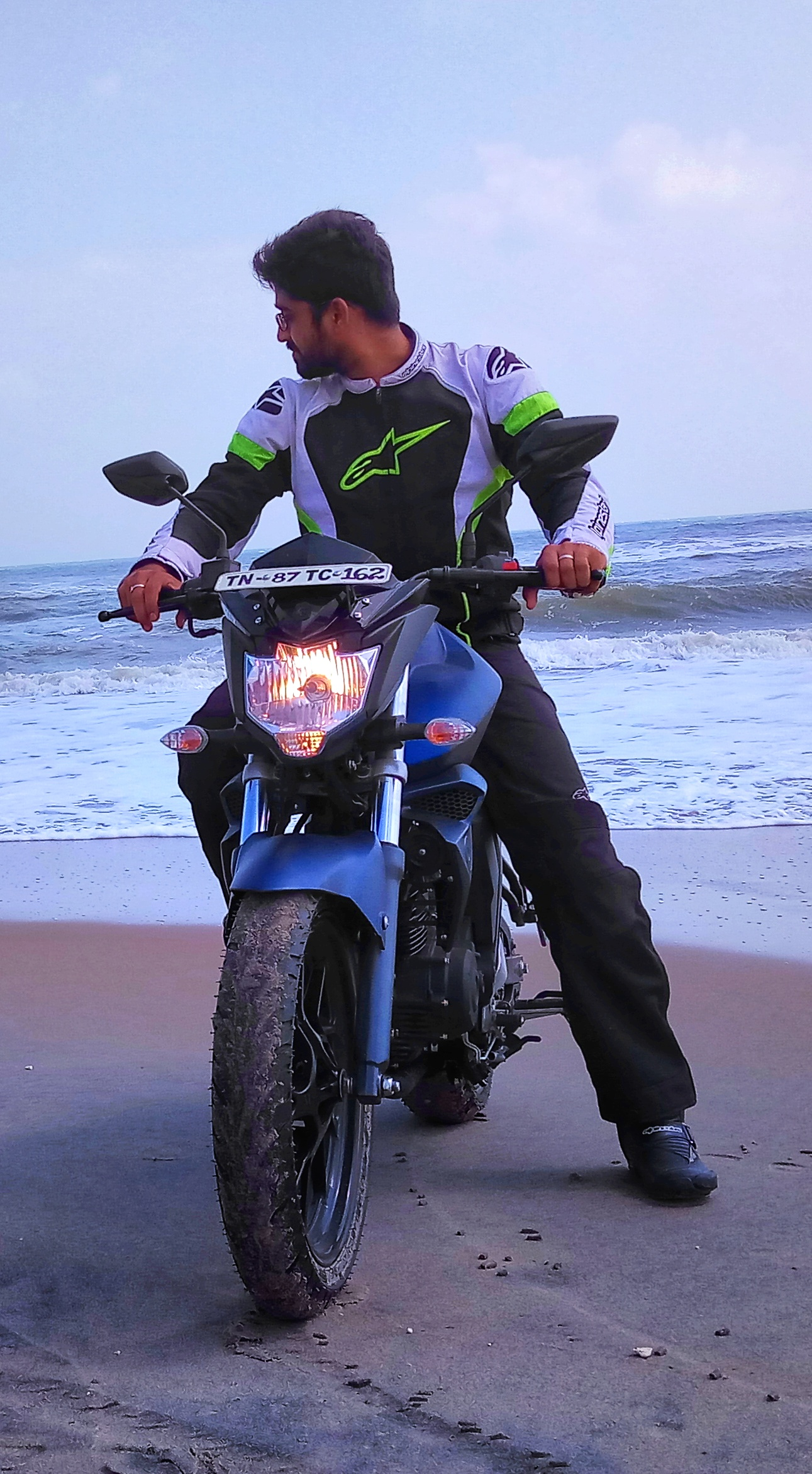
A person wearing an Alpinestars jacket

Alpinestars developed flame and heat retardant Nomex fire suits, footwear, gloves, and underwear for Formula One and NASCAR, which has been worn by recent champions Michael Schumacher, Jenson Button, Fernando Alonso and Jimmie Johnson. Top Gear's the Stig wears a white Alpinestars race suit, shoes and gloves.

Alpinestars made mountain bikes until 1996. In 2023, Alpinestars launched the company's first full-face road helmet – the Supertech R10 – for motorcycling.

Concerning motorcycling protection, Alpinestars has notably high scores in MotoCAP's independent safety tests. The Halo Drystar was the world's first textile jacket to achieve a 4-star rating in MotoCAP testing. Also, Bennetts in the UK noted “the outstanding performance of these Alpinestars in MotoCAP testing” regarding the company's GP Plus R V2 gloves. Alpinestars produced the world's first gloves to achieve a 5-star rating in MotoCAP tests. And at the time of writing, more Alpinestars gloves have earned a 5-star rating in MotoCAP tests than any other manufacturer.

Alpinestars was the first Italian manufacturer whose range included motorcycle gloves that achieved CE Level 2 (the highest European Committee for Standardization protection level).
