= Ken De Dycker =

Belgian motorcycle racer

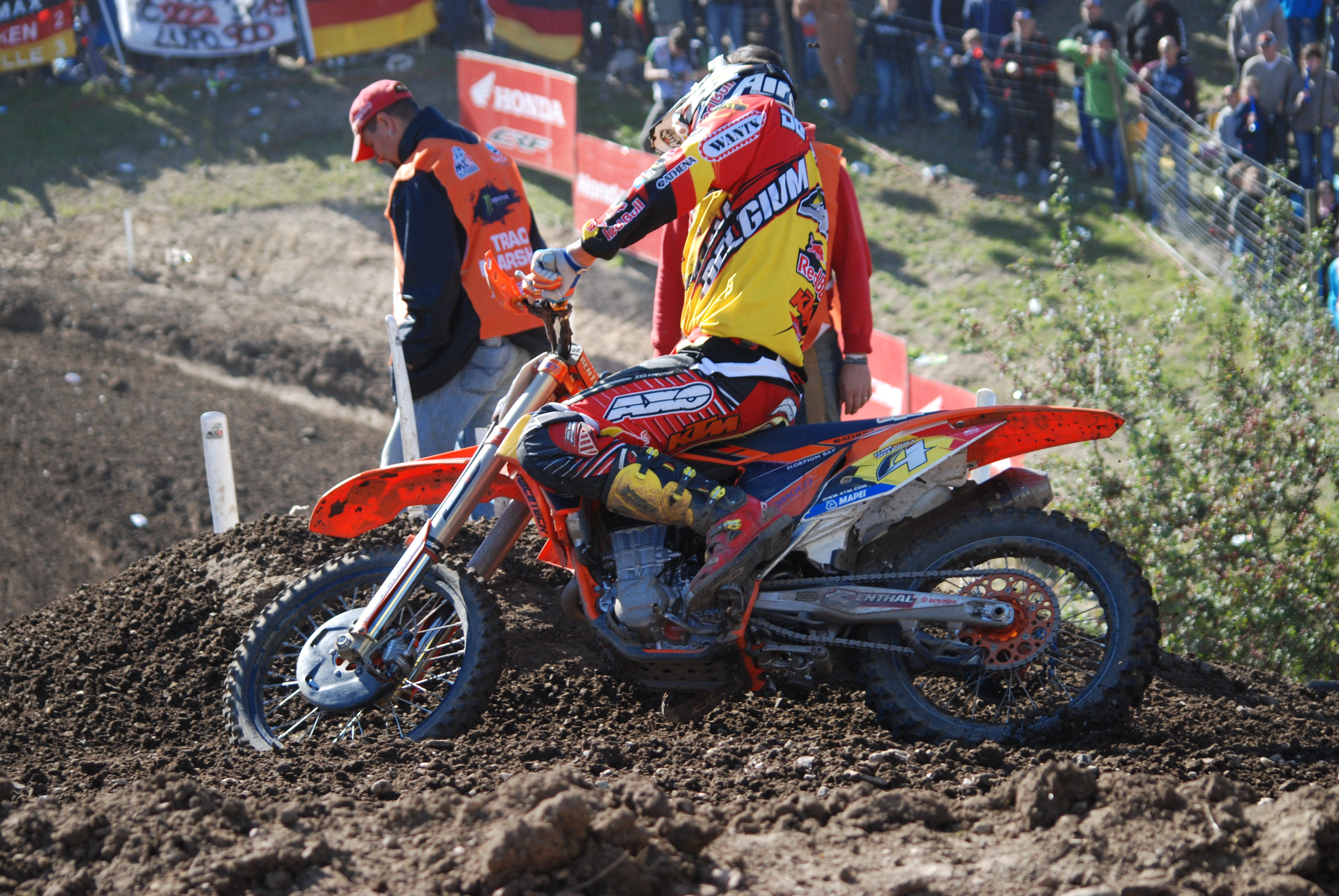
- De Dycker in 2013
- Nationality: Belgian
- Born: 6 June 1984 (age 42) Neerpelt, Belgium

Motocross career
- Years active: 2004–2018
- Teams: Suzuki, Yamaha, KTM
- Grands Prix: 188
- Wins: •MX1: 5
- GP debut: 2000, GP of Holland, 125cc
- First GP win: 2007, GP of Sweden, MX1

Ken De Dycker (born 6 June 1984) is a Belgian former professional motocross racer. He competed in the Motocross World Championships from 2004 to 2018. De Dycker represented Belgium at the Motocross des Nations four times and was a member of the winning Belgium team at the 2013 Motocross des Nations event that included Clément Desalle and Jeremy Van Horebeek.

== Motocross career ==
De Dycker was born in Neerpelt, Belgium. His best results in the motocross world championships was a third-place finish in the 2008 FIM Motocross World Championship season riding for the Teka-Suzuki team run by Sylvain Geboers and another third-place finish in 2013.

For the 2010 season, De Dycker switched to the Yamaha team run by former motocross world champion Michele Rinaldi. He remained there for only one season, achieving one GP victory, before switching to the factory Martin Honda squad where he spent one injury troubled year in the 2011 season. From the 2012 season onwards, De Dycker has rode for the factory Red Bull KTM team partnering Antonio Cairoli. It was his best season for some time putting in good consistent results, finishing on the podium several times and finally ending a creditable fifth in the world championship.

The 2013 season was an even bigger success, seeing De Dycker finish third in MX1. He established himself as a reliable back up rider for eight-time world champion Cairoli. He competed for Red Bull KTM in the 2014 season.

=== Motocross Des Nations ===
De Dycker first represented his country in the Motocross des Nations at the 2007 Motocross des Nations in Budds Creek in the USA. He filled the open category. In his first race, he recorded a second position behind Ryan Villopoto and was the first open class rider. In his second race, he could only manage 11th overall against the MX1 riders, and second out of the open riders. This was good enough for him to take second individually in the open class and help Belgium to third overall behind the US and France.

De Dycker followed this up the following year at the 2008 Motocross des Nations at Donington Park, Great Britain with a more consistent performance of eighth in his first race and fourth in his second. This time out he filled the MX1 berth and again finished second in class behind France's Sebastien Pourcel. For the second year in a row it was once again good enough to put Belgium third behind the US and France.

For the 2009, the 2010 and the 2011 editions, De Dycker was not selected to represent his country.

De Dycker made his return in the 2012 edition, held in his home country at the sandy Lommel circuit. He returned to the Open category and was partnered by Clement Desalle and Jeremy Van Horebeek. Aboard his KTM he recorded a third in his first race and a fifth in his second. This gave him third in the open class behind Jeffrey Herlings and Tanel Leok, it was good enough to help Team Belgium to second overall behind Germany.

For the 2013 edition in Teutschenthal Germany, Belgium opted for the same team as the year before, but this time, De Dycker swapped positions with Desalle to take on the incredibly competitive MX1 class. The Belgium team went into the final race with a slender advantage over USA, at the first corner disaster struck when Desalle went down injured without completing a lap. De Dycker had a bad start and found himself back in the pack, but he was able to take a second position behind Antonio Cairoli. This meant that Belgium could drop Desalle's DNF and claim a slender three-point victory, their first since 2004.
