= Tanel Leok =

Estonian motorcycle racer

- Leok at Glen Helen 2010.
- Nationality: Estonian
- Born: 1 June 1985 (age 41) Võru, then part of Estonian SSR, Soviet Union

Motocross career
- Years active: 2001 – present
- Teams: KTM, Suzuki, Kawasaki, Honda, Yamaha, TM, Husqvarna
- Grands Prix: 281 (13 125cc, 12 MX2, 153 MX1 and 103 MXGP)
- Wins: 3 (3 MX1)
- GP debut: 2001 GP da Holanda, 125cc
- First GP win: 2008 Irish GP, MX1

Tanel Leok (born 1 June 1985) is an Estonian professional motocross racer. He has competed in the Motocross World Championships since 2001.

== Early life ==
Leok was born in Võru, Estonia and currently resides in Balen, Belgium. His father, Arvo Leok, was a motocross rider and introduced his son to the sport at a young age. He lived in Estonia and attended Sõmerpalu Primary school until he was 16 years old when he decided to pursue his racing career full-time.

== Career ==
=== Early career ===
Leok became the first rider with two junior world titles to his credit, winning the 85 cc FIM world cup in 2000 and the 125cc FIM Junior World Cup in 2001. He turned semi-professional midway through the 2001 season, and qualified for a number of GP races at 15 years of age. He claimed his first senior title in 2001 as well, being crowned German 125cc champion. His hard-charging and unmistakable racing style earned him the moniker "The Estonian Express."

==== 2002–2003: KTM ====
In 2002, Leok's first professional team was Vangani Racing KTM His teammates were Tyla Rattray and Ben Townley. In 2003, the Vangani Racing team metamorphosed into Bruforce Racing, still on KTM motorcycles. Leok had by now definitely broken through in the top level of motocross world.

==== 2004: Suzuki ====
After a few successful races in the 125cc class in 2003, Leok successfully shifted to 250 cc class for the Motovision Racing Suzuki team in 2004. He made a huge impact during this season, being the only remaining top level rider on a two-stroke machine in the class. His reputation was solidified with a number of furious on-track battles with the hotshots of the class, such as multiple world champion Stefan Everts.

==== 2005–2008: Kawasaki ====
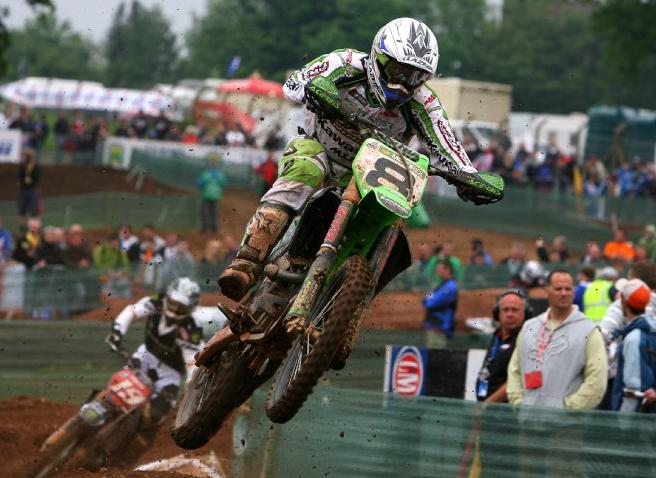
Tanel Leok in June 2008

At the end of the 2004 season, Leok signed a two-year contract with the Kawasaki factory team of legendary champion maker Jan De Groot. Leok claimed his first podium in FIM Motocross World Championships MX1 class on 2 April 2006 at Zolder, Belgium. This contract was renewed for another two-year term at the end of the 2006 racing season. After having claimed numerous GP podiums in the preceding year, Leok won his first MX1 Grand Prix in Ireland in 31, August 2008. He claimed 9 podiums and 1449 points with kawasaki team.

==== 2009: Yamaha ====
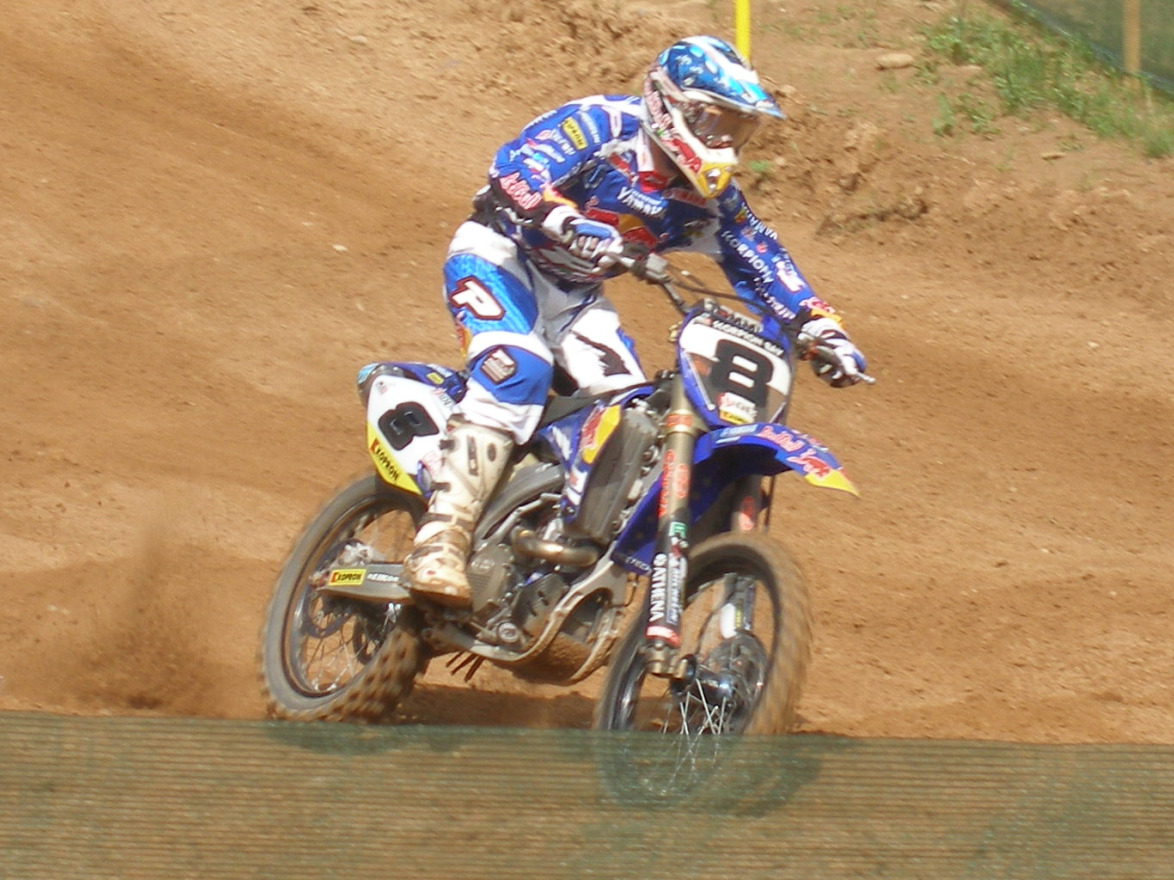
Tanel Leok in June 2009

At the end of the 2008 season, Red Bull Yamaha De Carli announced that they will move on to MX1-GP in the 2009 season and the riders will be Antonio Cairoli and Tanel Leok. The 2009 season started off well for the Estonian, winning the Italian MX1 motocross championships by a margin of five points over Cairoli (158–153). He won the first GP of the season in Faenza, Italy, and was the first holder of the red plate marking him as world championship leader. The 2009 season was a steady season for Leok, who only had two retirements: the first race in Latvia and the second race in Brazil.

==== 2010: Honda ====
Leok signed with Honda on September 27, 2009, and for the 2010 season he was the in LS Motors Honda team, which his teammate being Davide Guarneri. In his first season with LS Motors Honda team, Leok chose his "legendary" riding number 40, he started riding in MX1 class with this number in 2004. In addition, he got his first personal driving trainer – Marnicq Bervoets, this is very important renewal for Leok. His first competition with Honda was on February 7, 2010, in the Mantua Starcross. He had good starts, placed third in second race and first in third race, overall place was sixth, because he retired first race. Tanel Leok finished second to Guarneri in Italian MX1 motocross championships. Leok lost the championship by 17 points (152–135). On May 16, 2010, Leok won the second race and was the overall winner in the Grand Prix of Catalunya.

==== 2011: TM ====
In September 2010, Leok signed with TM Racing Factory Team. His first competition with TM was on February 19–20, 2011 in Mantova Starcross. Leok finished second in all three races and were also second overall behind David Philippaerts. The 2011 season was poor season for Leok, he had several crashes and technical problems with bike. The best moment of this season was a holeshot win in the Grand Prix of Czech Republic and the worst moment was the crash in the Grand Prix of Great Britain.

==== 2012: Suzuki ====
In October 2011, Leok signed with Rockstar Energy Suzuki World MX1 team, this is Suzuki factory team. His teammate in 2012 season was Clement Desalle. On February 5, 2012, Leok battled snow and icy conditions to race to second place overall against 1080 riders at Enduropale du Touquet Beach Race in northern France, less than two minutes behind overall winner Jean-Claude Mousse. Leok's best race in the 2012 season was in the Benelux GP, where he got his only podium in the season.

==== 2013: Honda and TM ====
In September 2012, Leok signed for British motocross team Route77energy MVR-D Honda. His teammate in 2013 season was Jason Dougan. On 2 June, Leok crashed heavily and broke his collarbone, causing him two miss two races. At the end of the month, Route77 Honda withdrew from the World Motocross Championship due to financial problems. Prior to the Swedish Grand Prix, Leok rejoined the TM Racing Factory Team.

==== 2014: TM ====
In November 2013, Leok re-signed for Italian motocross team TM Ricci Racing. His teammate in 2014 season was Davide Guarneri. TM Ricci Racing rider Leok did not have the best of starts to the season mostly due to a knee injury he picked up in the off-season.

==== 2015: Kawasaki ====
For 2015, Leok signed an agreement with the British-based LPE Kawasaki Team for next year. After a long time in the Grand Prix's, Leok would focus himself on the British MX1 Championship and the MX Nationals in Great Britain. Leok had a good season racing the British Championship and finished second in the championship under the LPE Kawasaki.

==== 2016–2025: Husqvarna ====
Tanel Leok has once again inked a deal to join up with the MVR-D team for the third time in his career. His team clearly kept in good terms and Leok would now be racing the British championship for them in 2016 – the team have decided to run Husqvarna's in 2016 switching from the Honda machine.

In September 2016, Leok signed with 8Biano Husqvarna racing team. His teammate in 2017 season was Rui Goncalves.

Leok, a former factory rider, turned 2018 season privateer and team manager of his own A1 Motorsport Husqvarna team.

Leok has the world record of the most Motocross of Nations performances, he has 19 straight years and 19 times in the final. He achieved his 19th race in 2019 Motocross des Nations

The A1 Motorsports Husqvarna privateer lined-up during 2020 season the second race here in Kegums, making it his 500th Grand Prix race attendance of his professional racing career, an incredible achievement for the Estonian rider. Leok announced on 3 November 2020 that, the Kegums round in Latvia next year would be the last of his 20-year career.

After competing in the 2024 Motocross des Nations, Leok holds the world record for the MX of Nations with 22 participations.

== Career summary ==
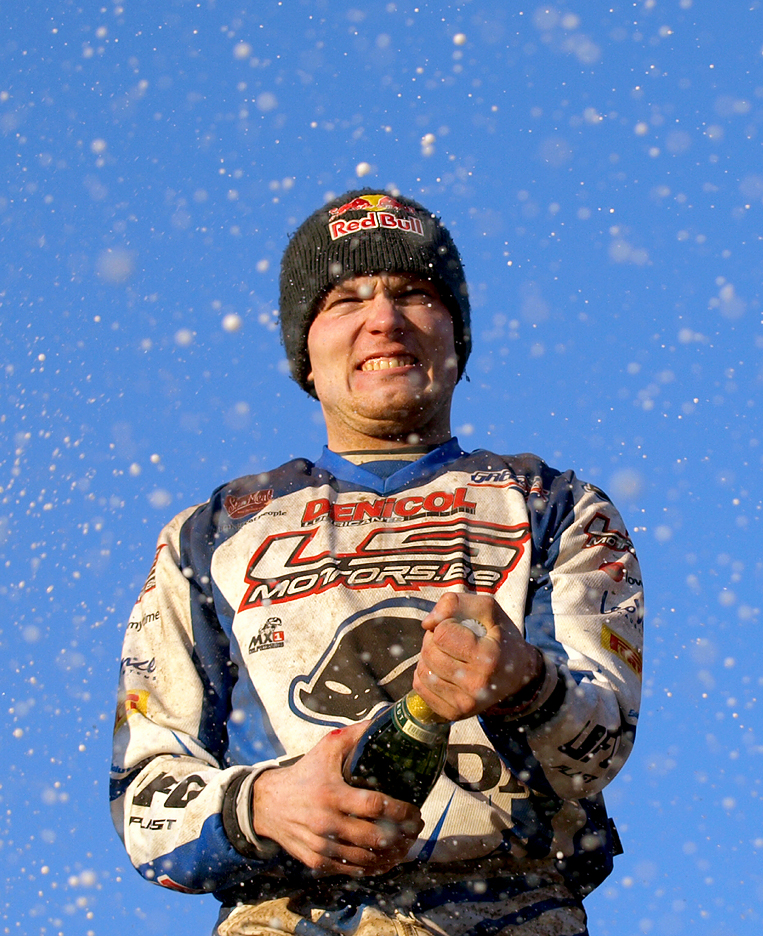
Tanel Leok celebrating win in 2010

Season	Series	Team name	Final Placing
1994	Estonian Motocross Championship 60cc	MK Sinilind	3rd
1995	Estonian Motocross Championship 60cc	MK Sinilind	2nd
1996	Estonian Supercross Championship 80cc	Sõmerpalu MK	3rd
1997	Estonian Snowcross Championship 80cc	Sõmerpalu MK	2nd
1997	European Motocross Championship 80cc	Sõmerpalu MK	1st
1997	European Motocross Cup 80cc	Sõmerpalu MK	25th
1998	Estonian Snowcross Championship 80cc	Sõmerpalu MK	2nd
1998	Estonian Supercross Championship 80cc	Sõmerpalu MK	1st
1998	Estonian Motocross Championship 80cc	Sõmerpalu MK	1st
1998	European Motocross Championship 80cc	Sõmerpalu MK	33rd
1999	Estonian Snowcross Championship 80cc	Sõmerpalu MK	1st
1999	European Motocross Championship 85cc	Sõmerpalu MK	5th
2000	World Junior Motocross Championship 80cc	Privateer Honda	1st
2000	European Motocross Championship 80cc	Privateer Honda	7th
2001	World Junior Motocross Championship 125cc	Bodo Schmidt Racing KTM	1st
2001	German Championship 125cc	Bodo Schmidt Racing KTM	1st
2001	European Championship 125cc	Bodo Schmidt Racing KTM	6th
2002	World Championship 125cc	Vangani Racing KTM	10th
2003	World Championship 125cc	Vangani Racing/Bruforce KTM	15th
2003	European Championship 125cc	Vangani Racing/Bruforce KTM	10th
2004	World Championship MX1	Motovision Suzuki	6th
2004	British Championship MX1	Motivision Suzuki	3rd
2004	KWS British Champion MX1	Motivision Suzuki	1st
2005	World Championship MX1	Kawasaki Racing Team	11th
2005	Dutch Championship MX1	Kawasaki Racing Team	3rd
2006	World Championship MX1	Kawasaki Racing Team	5th
2006	Belgian Championship MX1	Kawasaki Racing Team	13th
2006	British Championship MX1	Kawasaki Racing Team	31st
2007	World Championship MX1	Kawasaki Racing Team	8th
2007	Dutch Championship MX1	Kawasaki Racing Team	1st
2007	Belgian Championship MX1	Kawasaki Racing Team	12th
2007	British Championship MX1	Kawasaki Racing Team	16th
2008	World Championship MX1	Kawasaki Racing Team	8th
2008	Belgian Championship MX1	Kawasaki Racing Team	13th
2008	Dutch Championship MX1	Kawasaki Racing Team	8th
2008	Estonian Championship MX1	Kawasaki Racing Team	1st
2008	Estonian Championship MX2	Kawasaki Racing Team	1st
2009	Italian Championship MX1	Yamaha Red Bull De Carli	1st
2009	Belgian Championship MX1	Yamaha Red Bull De Carli	9th
2009	World Championship MX1	Yamaha Red Bull De Carli	7th
2010	Italian Championship MX1	LS Honda	2nd
2010	Belgian Championship MX1	LS Honda	2nd
2010	Dutch Championship MX1	LS Honda	23rd
2010	World Championship MX1	LS Honda	6th
2011	Italian Championship MX1	TM Racing Factory Team	9th
2011	World Championship MX1	TM Racing Factory Team	12th
2012	Enduropale Du Touquet Beach Race	Rockstar Energy Suzuki	2nd
2012	Belgian Championship MX1	Rockstar Energy Suzuki	2nd
2012	Estonian Championship MX1	Rockstar Energy Suzuki	10th
2012	World Championship MX1	Rockstar Energy Suzuki	8th
2013	World Championship MX1	Route77 Energy Honda, TM Ricci Racing	14th
2013	Maxxis British Championship MX1	Route77 Energy Honda, TM Ricci Racing	6th
2013	Estonian Championship MX1	Route77 Energy Honda	11th
2014	World Championship MXGP	TM Ricci Racing	18th
2014	Estonian Championship MX1	TM Ricci Racing	2nd
2014	Baltic Championship MX1	TM Ricci Racing	6th
2015	MAXXIS ACU British Motocross Championship MX1	LPE Kawasaki	2nd
2015	MX Nationals in Great Britain ProX Pro MX1	LPE Kawasaki	16th
2015	World Championship MXGP	LPE Kawasaki	41st
2015	Estonian Championship MX1	LPE Kawasaki	3rd
2016	Italian Motocross Championship MX1	KTM	5th
2016	World Championship MXGP	Husqvarna, KTM	17th
2016	MAXXIS ACU British Motocross Championship MX1	MVR-D Fuel10K Husqvarna	4th
2016	Estonian Championship MX1	KTM	1st
2016	Estonian Championship MX2	KTM	2nd
2017	Italian Motocross Championship MX1	8Biano Husqvarna	5th
2017	World Championship MXGP	8Biano Husqvarna	15th
2017	Estonian Championship MX1	8Biano Husqvarna	1st
2017	Estonian Championship MX2	8Biano Husqvarna	1st
2018	World Championship MXGP	A1M Husqvarna	18th
2018	Estonian Championship MX1	A1M Husqvarna	1st
2019	World Championship MXGP	A1M Husqvarna	15th
2019	ADAC MX MASTERS Championship	A1M Husqvarna	3rd
2019	Estonian Championship MX1	A1M Husqvarna	3rd
2020	World Championship MXGP	A1M Husqvarna	23rd
2020	Estonian Championship MX1	A1M Husqvarna	5th
2021	Italian Motocross Championship MX1	Husqvarna	15th
2021	Estonian Championship MX1	Husqvarna	10th
2022	World Championship MXGP	Husqvarna	42nd
2022	Supercross European Championship SX	Husqvarna	6th
2022	Swiss Motocross Championship MX Open	Husqvarna	28th
2022	Estonian Championship MX Open	Husqvarna	5th
2023	World Championship MXGP	Husqvarna	41st
2023	AMA Motocross Championship 450cc	Husqvarna	59th
2023	Estonian Championship MX Open	Husqvarna	1st
2024	Estonian Championship MX Open	Husqvarna	2nd
2025	Estonian Championship MX Open	Husqvarna	10th

== Complete World Championship Results ==
Year	Team	Class	1	2	3	4	5	6	7	8	9	10	11	12	13	14	15	16	17	18	19	20	Pos.	Points
2001	KTM	125cc	ESP	NED; 21	AUS	BEL; 29	GER; 21	BEL	SWE	FRA	BEL	SUI	GER; 17	NED; 26	ITA	AUT; 17								0
2002	KTM	125cc	NED	ESP; 15	GER; 6	FRA; 28	ITA; 28	AUT	BUL	SWE	BEL	GER; 12	CZE; 15	RUS; 6									20th	51
2003	KTM	MX2	ESP; 14	NED; 14	EUR; 22	ITA; 26	BUL; 14	AUT; 17	SWE; 12	BEL; 13	NED; 6	GER; 15	CZE; 11	FRA; 21									15th	73
2004	Suzuki	MX1	FLA; 8	ESP; 9	POR; 16	NED; 11	GER; 9	BEN; 7	GBR; 4	FRA; 5	ITA; 10	BEL; 8	SWE; 12	CZE; 6	WAL; 5	EUR; 9	IRL; 11	RSA; 12					6th	356
2005	Kawasaki	MX1	FLA; 11	ESP; 25	POR	BEL; 9	EUR; 5	JAP; 6	GBR; 13	ITA; 12	FRA; 18	SWE; 10	RSA; 11	WAL; 12	CZE; 7	GER; 5	ENG; 16	NED; 29	IRL; 5				11th	299
2006	Kawasaki	MX1	FLA; 3	ESP; 2	POR; 5	GER; 3	JAP; 5	BUL; 5	ITA; 4	GBR; 5	SWE; 12	RSA; 4	CZE; 7	BEL; 14	IRL; 9	NED; 12	FRA; 2						5th	443
2007	Kawasaki	MX1	BEN; 11	ESP; 7	POR; 12	ITA; 2	GER; 12	JAP; 14	FRA; 5	BUL; 11	SWE; 3	ITA; 9	CZE; 4	BEL; 3	IRL; 29	GBR; 6	NED; 12						8th	355
2008	Kawasaki	MX1	NED; 16	ESP; 5	POR; 9	BUL; 11	ITA; 8	GBR; 5	FRA; 9	GER; 3	SWE; 11	RSA; 9	BEL; 15	CZE; 7	IRL; 1	BEN; 14	ITA; 13						8th	352
2009	Yamaha	MX1	ITA; 1	BUL; 7	TUR; 10	BEN; 3	POR; 6	CAT; 10	GBR; 5	FRA; 4	GER; 7	LAT; 11	SWE; 6	BEL; 7	CZE; 9	NED; 4	BRA; 14						7th	395
2010	Honda	MX1	BUL; 14	LOM; 12	NED; 4	POR; 6	CAT; 1	USA; 31	FRA; 8	GER; 10	LAT; 8	SWE; 12	LIM; 5	CZE; 3	BRA; 8	BEN; 6	ITA; 15						6th	356
2011	TM	MX1	BUL; 15	NED; 9	USA; 16	BRA; 14	FRA; 10	POR; 9	ESP; 6	SWE; 18	GER; 19	LAT; 10	LIM; 6	CZE; 4	GBR; 13	EUR; 16	ITA; 17						12th	267
2012	Suzuki	MX1	NED; 9	BUL; 11	ITA; 10	MEX; 5	BRA; 14	FRA; 15	POR; 9	BEL; 7	SWE; 6	LAT; 7	RUS; 10	CZE; 9	GBR; 7	BEN; 3	EUR; 8	GER; 13					8th	381
2013	Honda	MX1	QAT; 14	THA; 12	NED; 8	ITA; 16	BUL; 15	POR; 12	BRA; 16	FRA	ITA												14th	232
2013	TM	MX1										SWE; 13	LAT; 18	FIN; 19	GER; 15	CZE; 10	BEL; 11	GBR; 9	EUR; 14				14th	232
2014	TM	MXGP	QAT; 13	THA; 14	BRA; 18	ITA; 19	BUL; 15	NED; 9	ESP; 18	GBR; 16	FRA; 15	ITA; 13	GER	SWE; 22	FIN; 16	CZE; 9	BEL; 22	BRA	MEX				18th	146
2015	Kawasaki	MXGP	QAT	THA	ARG	ITA; 23	EUR; 19	ESP	GBR	FRA	ITA	GER	SWE	LAT; 19	CZE	BEL; 24	ITA	NED	MEX	USA			41st	15
2016	Husqvarna	MXGP	QAT; 14										GBR; 19										17th	193
2016	KTM	MXGP		THA; 17	EUR; 10	ARG	MEX	LAT; 12	GER; 15	ITA; 9	ESP; 16	FRA		ITA; 14	CZE; 16	BEL; 10	SUI; 13	NED; 7	USA	USA			17th	193
2017	Husqvarna	MXGP	QAT; 18	INA; 8	ARG; 21	MEX; 19	ITA; 17	EUR; 12	LAT; 11	GER; 12	FRA; 15	RUS; 13	ITA; 14	POR; 12	CZE; 14	BEL; 15	SUI; 23	SWE; 12	USA	NED; 8	FRA; 13		15th	223
2018	Husqvarna	MXGP	ARG; 22	EUR; 16	ESP; 19	ITA; 17	POR; 17	RUS; 23	LAT; 17	GER; 21	GBR; 22	FRA; 20	ITA; 18	INA	INA	CZE; 15	BEL; 14	SUI; 14	BUL; 15	TUR	NED; 12	ITA; 18	18th	139
2019	Husqvarna	MXGP	ARG	GBR; 14	NED; 15	ITA; 16	ITA; 17	POR; 18	FRA; 15	RUS; 20	LAT; 15	GER; 15	INA; 11	INA; 11	CZE; 15	BEL; 15	ITA; 14	SWE; 22	TUR; 17	CHN; 13			15th	198
2020	Husqvarna	MXGP	GBR; 31	NED; 23	LAT; 23	LAT; 27	LAT; 22	ITA; 24	ITA; 18	ITA; 25	ITA; 19	ITA; 16	ITA; 14	ESP	BEL; 16	BEL; 15	BEL; 16	ITA; 17	ITA; 19	ITA; 21			23rd	94
2022	Husqvarna	MXGP	GBR	ITA	ARG	POR	ITA	LAT; 18	ITA	ITA	ESP	FRA	GER	INA	CZE	BEL	SWE	FIN; 23	FRA	TUR			42nd	6
2023	Husqvarna	MXGP	ARG	ITA	SUI	ITA	POR	ESP	FRA	LAT; 16	GER	INA	INA	CZE	BEL	FIN	SWE	NED	TUR	ITA	GBR		41st	10

== Personal life ==
Leok married Karoliina Karu on 11 October 2008. They have three sons, Sebastian (born 3 December 2007), Travis Leok (born 14 April 2010) and Leon Leok (born 14 March 2015). His cousin Aigar Leok is also a motocross racer.
