= Juss Laansoo =

Estonian motorcycle rider

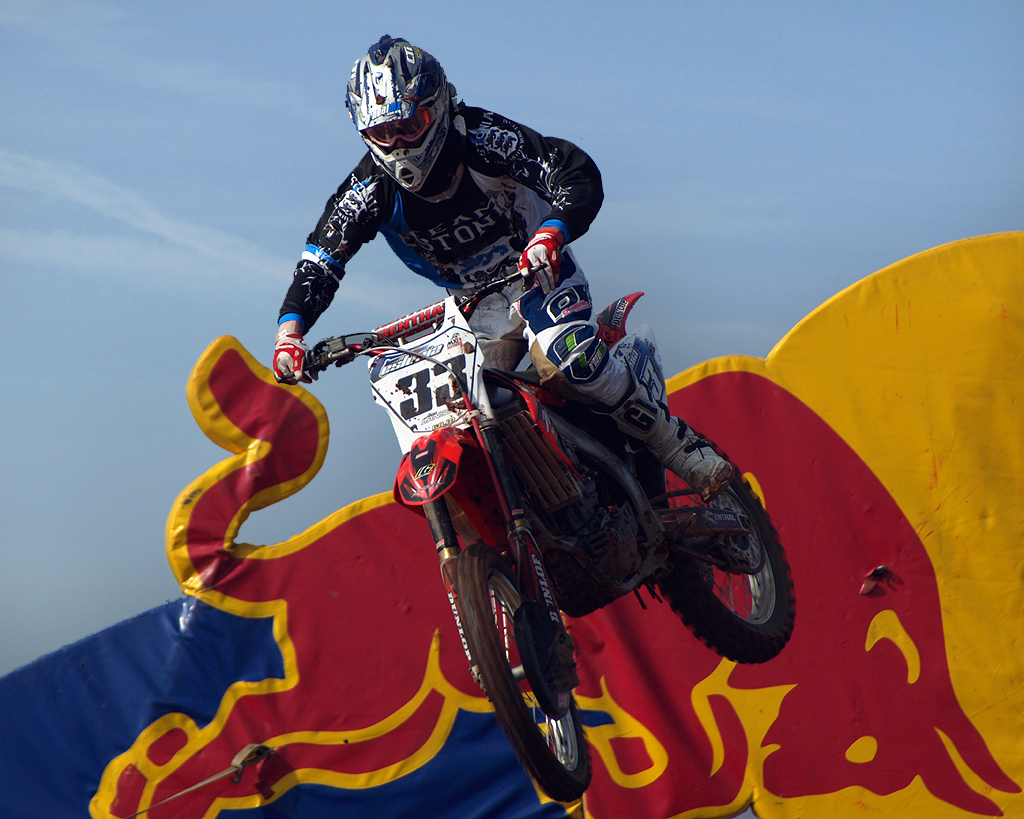
Juss Laansoo in 2008

Juss Laansoo (born 23 April 1983) is an Estonian motorcycle racer.

Laansoo was born in Tallinn.

Laansoo started his motorsport training in 1990 under the guidance of his father. In 2002, he won Juniors Motocross European Championships. He has competed at European Motocross Championship. He is 11-time Estonian champion. From 1998 to 2010, he was a member of Estonian national motocross team.
