= Aigar Leok =

Estonian motorcycle racer

Aigar Leok (born 9 August 1985) is an Estonian motorcycle racer.

Leok was born in Võru. His father is motorcycle racer Aivar Leok. His cousin is motorcycle racer Tanel Leok.

Leok has studied at the University of Tartu's Institute of Physical Education.

Leok is involved with motorsport since 1990, at first coached by his father. In 1999 he won gold medal at European Championships. From 2003–2009, he was a member of Estonian national motocross team. He is multiple-times Estonian champion in different motorcycling disciplines.

In 2012, 2013 and 2015, Leok was named as Best Motorsport Personnel of Estonia.
