= Laguna Carén =

Lagoon in Santiago, Chile

- Location in Chile
- Location: Santiago Province, Santiago Metropolitan Region
- Coordinates: 33°25′50″S 70°50′29″W
- Type: Lagoon
- Basin countries: Chile
- Surface area: 225 km^{2} (87 sq mi)
- Surface elevation: 470 m (1,540 ft)
- Settlements: Pudahuel

Laguna Carén is a lagoon and wetland located in the commune of Pudahuel, Santiago Province, Santiago Metropolitan Region, Chile. The lagoon obtained its name from the Mapuche term karv we, meaning "green place".

== See also ==
- Laguna de Aculeo
- Laguna Redonda
