= Tyla Rattray =

South African motocross racer

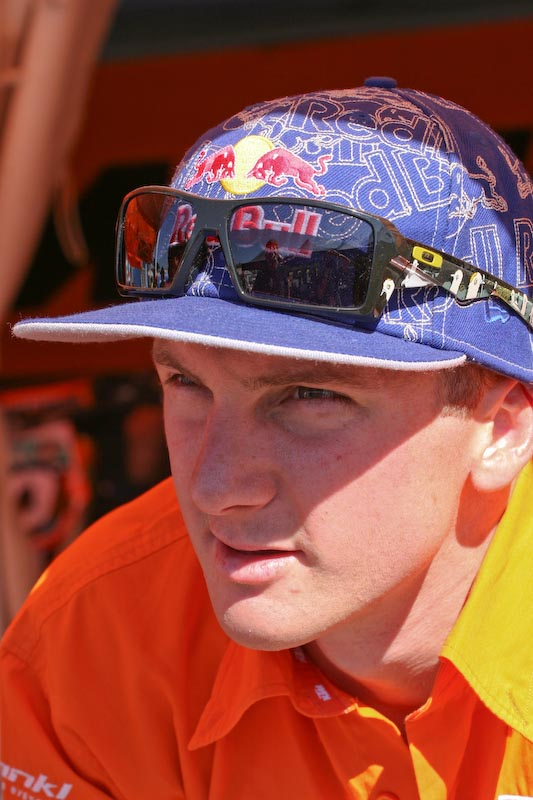
- Tyla Rattray (2008)
- Nationality: South African
- Born: 8 November 1985 (age 40) Durban, South Africa

Motocross career
- Years active: 1999–2015
- Teams: KTM, Kawasaki, Husqvarna
- Championships: MX2-GP – 2008
- Wins: 15

Tyla Rattray (born 12 November 1985) is a South African former professional motocross racer and current motocross team trainer. He competed in the Motocross World Championships from 1999 to 2008 and, in the AMA Motocross Championships from 2009 to 2013. He returned to the Motocross World Championships for his final two seasons from 2014 to 2015. Rattray is notable for winning the FIM MX2 world championship in 2008.

== Motocross racing career ==
Born in Durban, South Africa, Rattray made his first foray into international racing in 1999 when he participated in the inaugural FIM 85cc world cup at Gaildorf, Germany. Although completely unfamiliar with the conditions, he slotted straight into top level of international level racing and finished third in the event. He relocated to Germany in 2000 as part of the Vangani Racing team, and participated in European, German and Dutch Championship events, as well as international races. In 2001, at 15 years of age, he qualified for his first GP races. He also participated in European Championship events, and improved his standing in the Dutch Championship series.

In 2002, Rattray formed part of the Vangani Racing "dream team" with Ben Townley and Tanel Leok. He won the first GP qualifying race of the season at Valkenswaard, and finished eighth in the GP. Later that year, he scored his first GP podium when he finished second at Genk in Belgium. At 16 years of age, he was one of the youngest GP podium finishers ever. He won the Dutch 125cc – and Superfinal titles in 2003 as part of the Bruforce Racing KTM team.

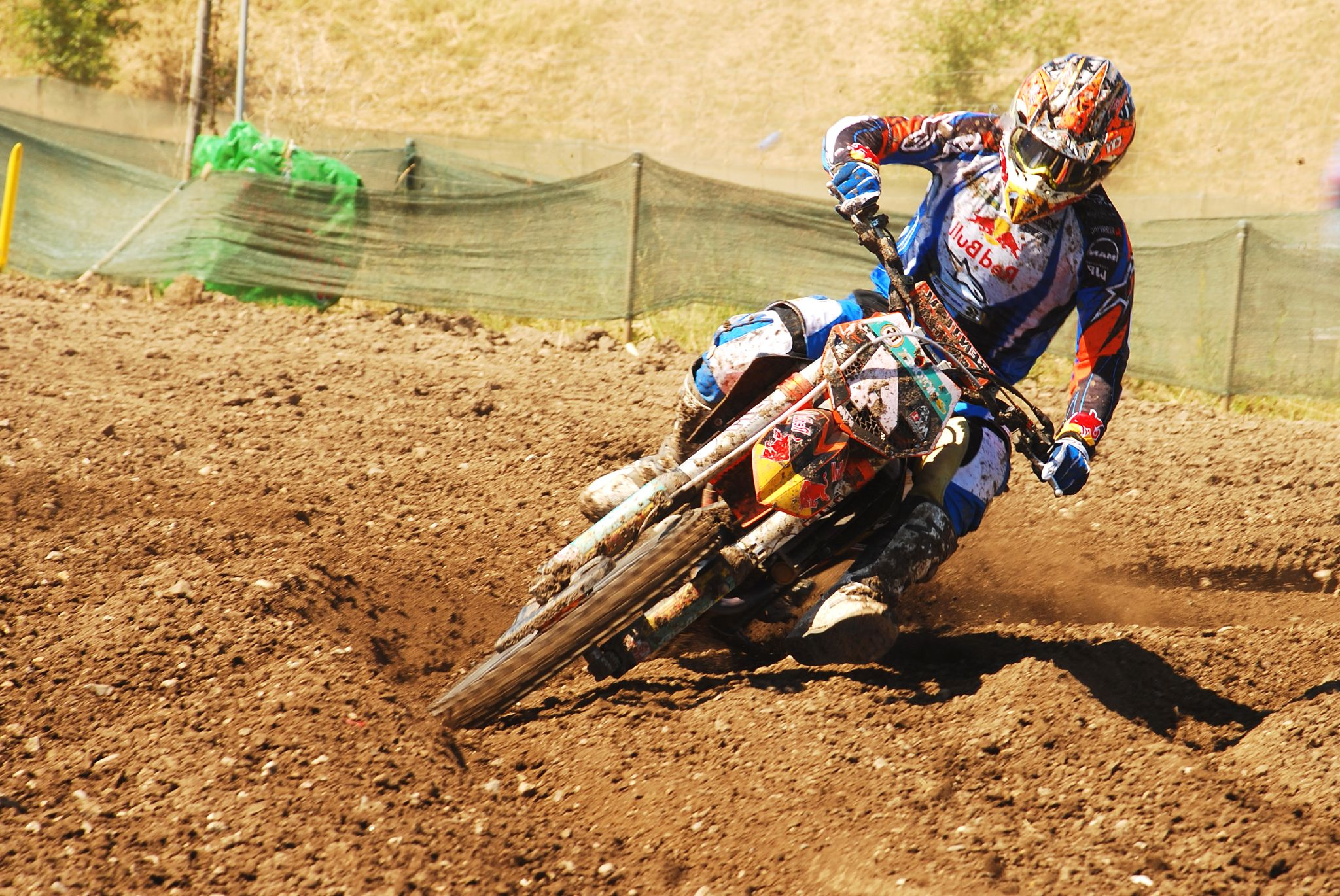
Rattray in 2008

Rattway won his first GP at Bellpuig in Spain in 2004. He finished second to KTM teammate Ben Townley in the world championship series in the 2004 MX2-GP season. Injuries kept him from challenging for the world title in 2005 and 2006. In 2008, he won the F.I.M. MX2-GP world championship riding for the KTM factory racing team managed by former world champion Stefan Everts. Before the start of the season, he opted to change his permanent race number from 16 to 4 since it was available. He joined the short list of other South Africans who have taken an F.I.M. World title which include Grant Langston (one world title) and Greg Albertyn (three world titles).

Before the start of the 2009 FIM Motocross World Championship season, it was announced the factory KTM team and Rattray were parting ways. Both Rattray and KTM parted mutually as Ratray expressed a greater interest to ride in the United States, following the path of other South Africans such as Grant Langston and Greg Albertyn. Rattray competed in the AMA Motocross Championship for five seasons, finishing in second place in the 250 national championship for two consecutive years in 2010 and 2011.

Rattray returned to compete in the 2014 MXGP world championship for the Red Bull Ice 1 – Husqvarna Racing Team owned by Formula One racer, Kimi Räikkönen. He retired from motocross racing after finishing 13th in the 2015 MXGP world championship and, began working as the team trainer and mentor for the Troy Lee Designs / Redbull KTM 250 team.
