= Sébastien Pourcel =

French motorcycle racer

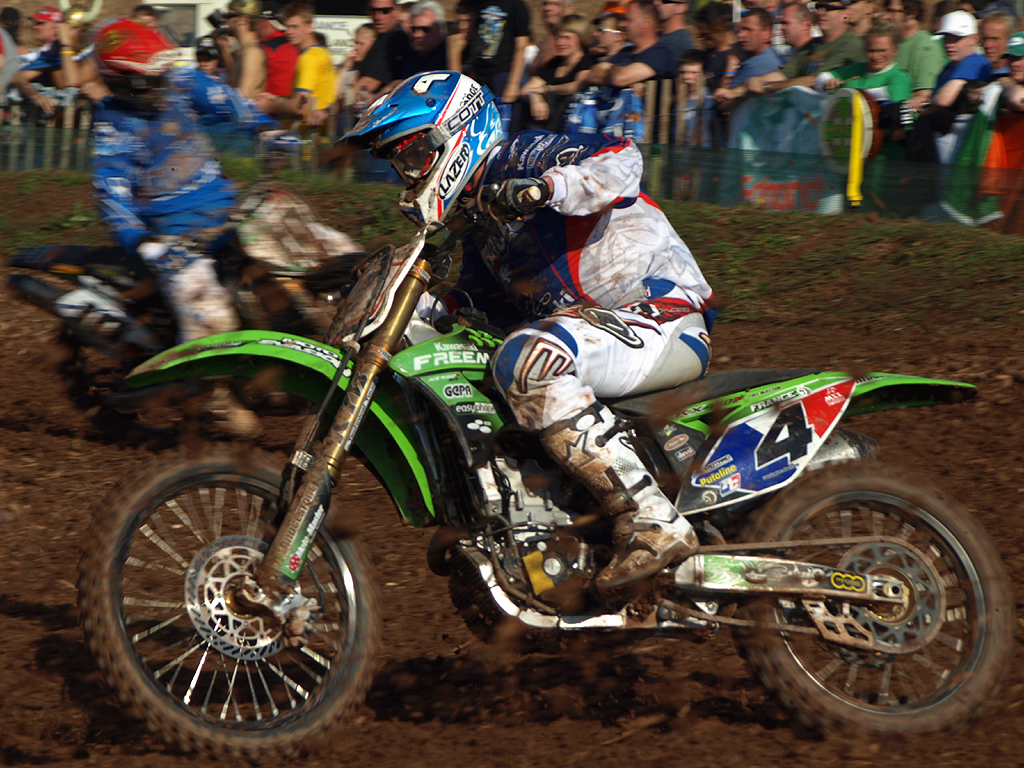
- Sébastien Pourcel (2008)
- Nationality: French
- Born: 11 February 1985 (age 40); Martigues, Bouches-du-Rhône, France

Motocross career
- Years active: 2002 - 2014
- Teams: Kawasaki
- Wins: 4
- GP debut: 2002 125cc French Grand Prix
- First GP win: 2007 MX1 Italian Grand Prix

Sébastien Pourcel (born 11 February 1985) is a French former professional motocross racer. He competed in the Motocross World Championships from 2002 to 2014.

Pourcel was born in Martigues, Bouches-du-Rhône. He started international motocross competition in 2002 in the MX2-GP class. In 2007, he moved up to the premier MX1-GP class and finished in a career-high fourth place. He joined his brother Christophe Pourcel on the official Kawasaki GPKR Team, which was started by their father, Roger, and Patrick Gelade.
