= David Philippaerts =

Italian motorcycle racer (born 1983)

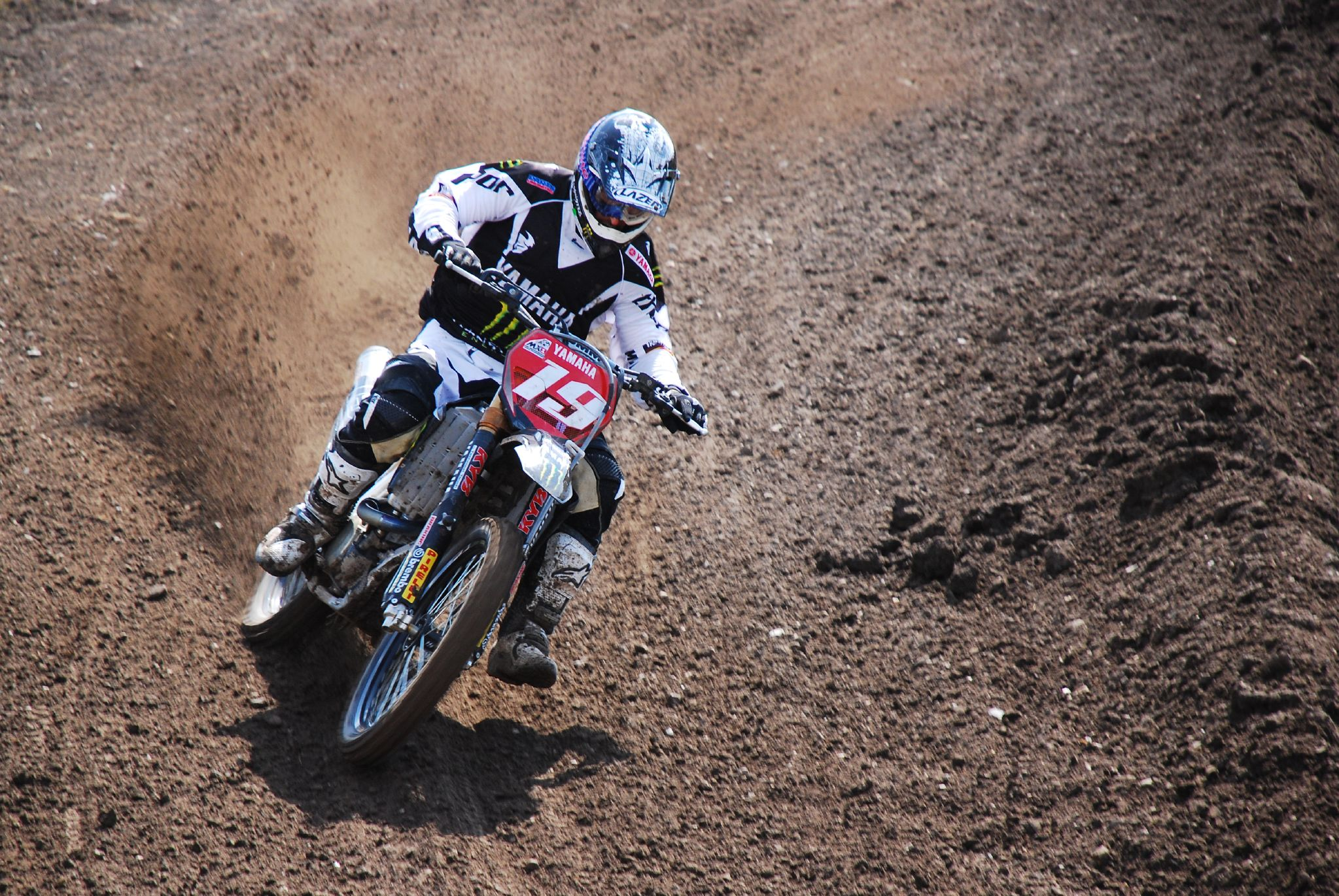
- Philippaerts in 2008
- Nationality: (Italy) Italian
- Born: 7 December 1983 (age 41); Pietrasanta, Italy

Motocross career
- Years active: 2000-2016, 2021-2022
- Teams: Yamaha, KTM, Honda
- Grands Prix: •MX2: 45 •MX1: 137
- Championships: •2008 MX1
- Wins: •MX2: 6 •MX1: 6

David Philippaerts (born 7 December 1983 in Pietrasanta) is an Italian former professional motocross racer of Italian and Belgian descent. He competed in the Motocross World Championships from 2000 to 2014 before returning as a wild card in 2022. His most notable achievement is winning the 2008 MX1 World Championship.

Philippaerts was the 2008 F.I.M. world champion in the MX-1GP class riding for a Yamaha team run by former motocross world champion Michele Rinaldi.

Sporting positions
Preceded by Steve Ramon	World Champion - MX1; 2008	Succeeded by Antonio Cairoli
