= 2009 Motocross des Nations =

Seasons
- ← 2008 2010 →

The 2009 Motocross des Nations took place after the 2009 FIM Motocross World Championship season, on October 4, 2009 in Franciacorta, Italy.

== Entry list ==
All entries taken from the official MX Nations site.

	Country	Nr	Rider	Class	Motorcycle	Team manager
1	United States	1	Ryan Dungey	MX1	Suzuki 450	Roger de Coster
1	United States	2	Jake Weimer	MX2	Kawasaki 250	Roger de Coster
1	United States	3	Ivan Tedesco	OPEN	Honda 450	Roger de Coster
2	France	4	Steven Frossard	MX1	Kawasaki 450	Olivier Robert
2	France	5	Marvin Musquin	MX2	KTM 250	Olivier Robert
2	France	6	Gautier Paulin	OPEN	Kawasaki 450	Olivier Robert
3	Belgium	7	Clément Desalle	MX1	Honda 450	Joël Smets
3	Belgium	8	Joël Roelants	MX2	KTM 250	Joël Smets
3	Belgium	9	Steve Ramon	OPEN	Suzuki 450	Joël Smets
4	(United Kingdom) Great Britain	10	Billy MacKenzie	MX1	Honda 450	TBA
4	(United Kingdom) Great Britain	11	Tommy Searle	MX2	KTM 250	TBA
4	(United Kingdom) Great Britain	12	Shaun Simpson	OPEN	KTM 450	TBA
5	Italy	13	Antonio Cairoli	MX1	Yamaha 450	Andrea Bartolini
5	Italy	14	Davide Guarneri	MX2	Yamaha 250	Andrea Bartolini
5	Italy	15	David Philippaerts	OPEN	Yamaha 450	Andrea Bartolini
6	Australia	16	Chad Reed	MX1	Suzuki	Gary Benn
6	Australia	17	Brett Metcalfe	MX2	Honda 250	Gary Benn
6	Australia	18	Michael Byrne	OPEN	Suzuki 450	Gary Benn
7	Spain	19	Jonathan Barragan	MX1	KTM 450	Josep Alonso
7	Spain	20	Christian Oliva	MX2	Yamaha 250	Josep Alonso
7	Spain	21	Carlos Campano Jiminez	OPEN	Yamaha 450	Josep Alonso
8	New Zealand	22	Joshua Coppins	MX1	Yamaha 450	Michael Mcleod
8	New Zealand	23	Michael Phillips	MX2	Honda 250	Michael Mcleod
8	New Zealand	24	Scott Columb	OPEN	Suzuki 450	Michael Mcleod
9	Switzerland	25	Julien Bill	MX1	Aprilia 450	Marc Ristori
9	Switzerland	26	Arnaud Tonus	MX2	KTM 250	Marc Ristori
9	Switzerland	27	Grégory Wicht	OPEN	Honda 450	Marc Ristori
10	Germany	28	Daniel Siegl	MX1	Suzuki 450	Olaf Noack
10	Germany	29	Ken Roczen	MX2	Suzuki 250	Olaf Noack
10	Germany	30	Maximilian Nagl	OPEN	KTM 450	Olaf Noack
11	Finland	31	Antti Pyrhönen	MX1	Honda 450	Jussi-Pekka Vehvilainen
11	Finland	32	Harri Kullas	MX2	KTM 250	Jussi-Pekka Vehvilainen
11	Finland	33	Eero Remes	OPEN	KTM 250	Jussi-Pekka Vehvilainen
12	Estonia	34	Aigar Leok	MX1	TM 450	Mart Lajal
12	Estonia	35	Gert Krestinov	MX2	KTM 250	Mart Lajal
12	Estonia	36	Tanel Leok	OPEN	Yamaha 450	Mart Lajal
13	Canada	37	Tyler Medaglia	MX1	Suzuki 450	Carl Bastedo
13	Canada	38	Dean Wilson	MX2	Kawasaki 250	Carl Bastedo
13	Canada	39	Mitchell Cooke	OPEN	Kawasaki 450	Carl Bastedo
14	Brazil	40	Wellington Garcia	MX1	Honda 450	Wilson Yasuda
14	Brazil	41	Swian Zanoni	MX2	Honda 250	Wilson Yasuda
14	Brazil	42	António Balbi Junior	OPEN	Honda 450	Wilson Yasuda
15	South Africa	43	Gareth Swanepoel	MX1	Kawasaki 450	TBA
15	South Africa	44	Tyla Rattray	MX2	Kawasaki 250	TBA
15	South Africa	45	Neville Bradshaw	OPEN	Honda 450	TBA
16	Latvia	46	Ivo Šteinbergs	MX1	Honda 450	Jānis Vilders
16	Latvia	47	Matīss Karro	MX2	Suzuki 250	Jānis Vilders
16	Latvia	48	Lauris Freibergs	OPEN	Yamaha 450	Jānis Vilders
17	Netherlands	52	Mike Kras	MX1	KTM 450	Leon Giesbers
17	Netherlands	53	Jeffrey Herlings	MX2	KTM 250	Leon Giesbers
17	Netherlands	54	Herjan Brakke	OPEN	Honda 250	Leon Giesbers
18	Puerto Rico	55	Gino Aponte	MX1	Yamaha 450	Gabriel Catala
18	Puerto Rico	56	Benjamin Evans	MX2	Yamaha 250	Gabriel Catala
18	Puerto Rico	57	Juan Font	OPEN	Yamaha 250	Gabriel Catala
19	Denmark	58	Nicolai Hansen	MX1	Suzuki 450	Brian Kjær Jørgensen
19	Denmark	59	Nikolaj Larsen	MX2	Suzuki 250	Brian Kjær Jørgensen
19	Denmark	60	Kasper Jensen	OPEN	Honda 250	Brian Kjær Jørgensen
20	(Republic of Ireland) Ireland	61	Gordon Crockard	MX1	Honda 450	Stephen Russel
20	(Republic of Ireland) Ireland	62	Martin Barr	MX2	Suzuki 250	Stephen Russel
20	(Republic of Ireland) Ireland	63	Graeme Irwin	OPEN	KTM 250	Stephen Russel
21	Russia	64	Evgeny Bobryshev	MX1	Yamaha 450	Gennady Yargin
21	Russia	65	Alexander Tonkov	MX2	Suzuki 250	Gennady Yargin
21	Russia	66	Dmitry Parshin	OPEN	Yamaha 450	Gennady Yargin
22	Sweden	67	Andreas Hultman	MX1	Honda 450	Patrik Olsson
22	Sweden	68	Filip Thuresson	MX2	Suzuki 250	Patrik Olsson
22	Sweden	69	Tom Söderström	OPEN	Kawasaki 450	Patrik Olsson
23	Portugal	70	Luís Correia	MX1	Yamaha 450	Pedro Castro
23	Portugal	71	Ruí Gonçalves	MX2	KTM 250	Pedro Castro
23	Portugal	72	Hugo Basuala	OPEN	Suzuki 450	Pedro Castro
24	Czech Republic	73	Martin Michek	MX1	TM 450	Jan Froňek
24	Czech Republic	74	Petř Šmitka	MX2	KTM 250	Jan Froňek
24	Czech Republic	75	Filip Neugebauer	OPEN	Kawasaki 450	Jan Froňek
25	Slovenia	76	Matevz Irt	MX1	Honda 450	Roman Jelen
25	Slovenia	77	Klemen Gerčar	MX2	Yamaha 250	Roman Jelen
25	Slovenia	78	Jernej Irt	OPEN	Husqvarna 250	Roman Jelen
26	Norway	79	Jan Olav Lunewski	MX1	Suzuki 450	Stian Orneberg
26	Norway	80	Remi Nyegård	MX2	Honda 250	Stian Orneberg
26	Norway	81	Even Heibye	OPEN	Honda 250	Stian Orneberg
27	Slovakia	85	Martin Kohut	MX1	KTM 450	Daniel Hirtel
27	Slovakia	86	Jozef Kulhavy	MX2	Honda 250	Daniel Hirtel
27	Slovakia	87	Tomáš Bučenec	OPEN	KTM 450	Daniel Hirtel
28	Iceland	88	Aron Ómarsson	MX1	Kawasaki 450	Stefan Gunnarsson
28	Iceland	89	Viktor Gudbergsson	MX2	Suzuki 250	Stefan Gunnarsson
28	Iceland	90	Gunnlaugur Karlsson	OPEN	KTM 505	Stefan Gunnarsson
29	Mongolia	94	Khadbaatar Temuujin	MX1	Suzuki 450	Dashdondog Ochirsukh
29	Mongolia	95	Broenebileg Khaliunbold	MX2	Suzuki 250	Dashdondog Ochirsukh
29	Mongolia	96	Boldbaataar Ganod	OPEN	Suzuki 250	Dashdondog Ochirsukh
30	Austria	101	Günter Schmidinger	MX1	Honda 450	Mario Mittermaier
30	Austria	102	Peter Reitbauer	MX2	Honda 250	Mario Mittermaier
30	Austria	103	Michael Staufer	OPEN	KTM 450	Mario Mittermaier
31	Cyprus	104	Savva Savvas	MX1	Yamaha 450	Antonis Siaptanis
31	Cyprus	105	Alexandros Nikolettis	MX2	Kawasaki 250	Antonis Siaptanis
31	Cyprus	106	Zanetos Koumasis	OPEN	Honda 450	Antonis Siaptanis
32	Croatia	113	Nenad Šipek	MX1	Yamaha 450	Ivan Lafter
32	Croatia	114	Marko Leljak	MX2	KTM 250	Ivan Lafter
32	Croatia	115	Danijel Božić	OPEN	KTM 480	Ivan Lafter
33	Thailand	116	Thanarat Penjan	MX1	Yamaha 450	Jan Postema
33	Thailand	117	Samart Tumasing	MX2	Honda 250	Jan Postema
33	Thailand	118	Wattana Kanlaya	OPEN	Suzuki 450	Jan Postema
34	Hungary	119	János Borka	MX1	Kawasaki 450	Ferenc Déczi
34	Hungary	120	Balázs Déczi	MX2	Suzuki 250	Ferenc Déczi
34	Hungary	121	Bence Szvodoba	OPEN	KTM 450	Ferenc Déczi
35	Greece	122	Panagiotis Kouzis	MX1	Yamaha 450	Catherine Welch
35	Greece	123	George Iliopoulos	MX2	KTM 250	Catherine Welch
35	Greece	124	Athanasios Avgeris	OPEN	KTM 250	Catherine Welch
36	(Ukraine) Ukraine^{1}	125	Sergiy Onypchenko	MX1	Honda 450	Sergiy Paschinskiy
36	(Ukraine) Ukraine^{1}	126	Roman Morozov	MX2	KTM 250	Sergiy Paschinskiy
36	(Ukraine) Ukraine^{1}	127	Mykola Paschynskyi	OPEN	KTM 505	Sergiy Paschinskiy
37	Lithuania	128	Raimund Machrov	MX1	Yamaha 450	Saulius Stankus
37	Lithuania	129	Nerijus Rukštela	MX2	Suzuki 250	Saulius Stankus
37	Lithuania	130	Radoslav Baranovskij	OPEN	Yamaha 450	Saulius Stankus

Note 1 : Ukraine did not participate.

== Qualifying ==
=== Qualifyied countries ===
Pos	Country	Points
1	Italy	2
2	France	3
3	Belgium	5
4	United Kingdom	6
5	Australia	7
6	United States	10
7	South Africa	11
8	New Zealand	15
9	Spain	16
10	Estonia	17
11	Germany	19
12	Portugal	20
13	Switzerland	24
14	Finland	25
15	Netherlands	25
16	Sweden	29
17	Latvia	29
18	Denmark	30
19	Brazil	30

=== Countries admitted to the B Final ===
Pos	Country	Points
20	Canada	31
21	(Republic of Ireland) Ireland	32
22	Russia	32
23	Slovenia	40
24	Slovakia	40
25	Austria	41
26	Puerto Rico	45
27	Norway	49
28	Czech Republic	50
29	Hungary	53
30	Croatia	54
31	Iceland	56
32	Greece	60

=== Non-qualifyied countries ===
Pos	Country	Points
33	Mongolia	62
34	Thailand	63
35	Lithuania	65
36	Cyprus	70

== B Final ==
Pos	Country	Points
1	(Republic of Ireland) Ireland^{1}	11
2	Czech Republic	14
3	Russia	16
4	Austria	19
5	Slovakia	22
6	Norway	24
7	Puerto Rico	32
8	Canada	34
9	Slovenia	39
10	Croatia	40
11	Iceland	46
12	Hungary	49
13	Greece	53

Note 1 : Ireland won the B final which meant they qualified for the main races.

== Race ==
Pos	Country	Riders	Race 1	Race 2	Race 3	Points
1	United States	Ryan Dungey	3		1	22
1	United States	Jake Weimer	8	(25)		22
1	United States	Ivan Tedesco		3	7	22
2	France	Steven Frossard	14		5	30
2	France	Marvin Musquin	5	5		30
2	France	Gautier Paulin		1	(37)	30
3	Belgium	Clement Desalle	4		(27)	39
3	Belgium	Joel Roelants	15	11		39
3	Belgium	Steve Ramon		7	2	39
4	Germany	Daniel Siegl	(36)		23	55
4	Germany	Ken Roczen	10	8		55
4	Germany	Maximilian Nagl		6	8	55
5	(United Kingdom) Great Britain	Billy Mackenzie	11		14	55
5	(United Kingdom) Great Britain	Tommy Searle	7	(17)		55
5	(United Kingdom) Great Britain	Shaun Simpson		13	10	55
6	Italy	Antonio Cairoli	1		(38)	59
6	Italy	Davide Guarneri	16	37		59
6	Italy	David Philippaerts		2	3	59
7	Australia	Chad Reed	2		9	73
7	Australia	Brett Metcalfe	17	9		73
7	Australia	Michael Byrne		(38)	36	73
8	Estonia	Aigar Leok	22		13	78
8	Estonia	Gert Krestinov	28	(31)		78
8	Estonia	Tanel Leok		4	11	78
9	South Africa	Gareth Swanepoel	9		30	84
9	South Africa	Tyla Rattray	13	10		84
9	South Africa	Neville Bradshaw		22	(35)	84
10	Switzerland	Julien Bill	21		12	88
10	Switzerland	Arnaud Tonus	23	14		88
10	Switzerland	Gregory Wicht		(35)	27	88
11	New Zealand	Joshua Coppins	6		6	89
11	New Zealand	Michael Phillips	(35)	32		89
11	New Zealand	Scott Columb		12	33	89
12	Spain	Jonathan Barragan	12		4	92
12	Spain	Cristian Oliva	(34)	33		92
12	Spain	Carlos Campano		15	28	92
13	Portugal	Luis Correia	(38)		15	112
13	Portugal	Rui Concalves	19	24		112
13	Portugal	Hugo Basaula		29	25	112
14	Brazil	Wellington Garcia	33		24	122
14	Brazil	Swian Zanoni	30	(34)		122
14	Brazil	Antonio Balbi		16	19	122
15	Denmark	Nicolai Hansen	(32)		21	123
15	Denmark	Nikolaj Larsen	26	21		123
15	Denmark	Kasper Jensen		26	29	123
16	(Republic of Ireland) Ireland	126				
17	Latvia	130				
18	Netherlands	133				
19	Sweden	143				
20	Finland	92				
