= 2022 British Motocross Championship =

British Motocross Competition in 2022

The 2022 ACU British Motocross Championship season (known for sponsorship reasons as the Revo MXGB fuelled by Gulf Race Fuels) was the 70th British Motocross Championship season.

Tommy Searle started the season as the reigning champion in the MX1 class and would go on to successfully defend his title, his fourth overall. This would be Searle's last season with the Honda team led by former world champion David Thorpe.

Similarly, Conrad Mewse successfully defending his MX2 crown from the previous season, winning his third national title overall. This title came after Mewse split with the Hitachi KTM fuelled by Milwaukee team two months before the start of the season. 2022 would be Mewse's last year in the MX2, with him moving up to MX1 in 2023.

== Race calendar and results ==
The full calendar with both dates and venues was released on 3 February.

=== MX1 ===
Round	Date	Location	Race 1 Winner	Race 2 Winner	Round Winner
1	12 March	Culham	(United Kingdom) Tommy Searle	(United Kingdom) Tommy Searle	(United Kingdom) Tommy Searle
2	17 April	Foxhill	(Estonia) Harri Kullas	(United Kingdom) Tommy Searle	(Estonia) Harri Kullas
3	8 May	Lyng	(Estonia) Harri Kullas	(United Kingdom) Tommy Searle	(United Kingdom) Tommy Searle
4	22 May	Canada Heights	(United Kingdom) Tommy Searle	(United Kingdom) Tommy Searle	(United Kingdom) Tommy Searle
5	19 June	Blaxhall	(Estonia) Harri Kullas	(United Kingdom) Shaun Simpson	(United Kingdom) Shaun Simpson
6	9 July	FatCat	(Estonia) Harri Kullas	(United Kingdom) Tommy Searle	(United Kingdom) Tommy Searle
7	30 July	Skelder Bank	(Estonia) Harri Kullas	(United Kingdom) Tommy Searle	(United Kingdom) Tommy Searle
8	10 September	Landrake	(Estonia) Harri Kullas	(United Kingdom) Josh Gilbert	(Estonia) Harri Kullas

=== MX2 ===
Round	Date	Location	Race 1 Winner	Race 2 Winner	Round Winner
1	12 March	Culham	(United Kingdom) Conrad Mewse	(United Kingdom) Conrad Mewse	(United Kingdom) Conrad Mewse
2	17 April	Foxhill	(United Kingdom) Conrad Mewse	(United Kingdom) James Carpenter	(United Kingdom) James Carpenter
3	8 May	Lyng	(United Kingdom) Conrad Mewse	(United Kingdom) Conrad Mewse	(United Kingdom) Conrad Mewse
4	22 May	Canada Heights	(Sweden) Isak Gifting	(Sweden) Isak Gifting	(Sweden) Isak Gifting
5	19 June	Blaxhall	(Sweden) Isak Gifting	(Sweden) Isak Gifting	(Sweden) Isak Gifting
6	9 July	FatCat	(United Kingdom) Conrad Mewse	(United Kingdom) Conrad Mewse	(United Kingdom) Conrad Mewse
7	30 July	Skelder Bank	(United Kingdom) Conrad Mewse	(New Zealand) Dylan Walsh	(United Kingdom) Conrad Mewse
8	10 September	Landrake	(New Zealand) Dylan Walsh	(United Kingdom) James Carpenter	(United Kingdom) James Carpenter

=== Circuit locations ===
2022 British Motocross Championship locations

== MX1 ==
=== Participants ===
Team	Constructor	No	Rider	Rounds
ASA United Gas Gas	Gas Gas	2	(United Kingdom) John Adamson	All
ASA United Gas Gas	Gas Gas	155	(United Kingdom) Jack Brunell	3–5
Carnegie Fuels	KTM	3	(United Kingdom) Ben Edwards	3, 6–7
KES Commercials St Blazey Honda	Honda	7	(United Kingdom) Louie Kessell	8
Phoenix Evenstrokes Kawasaki	Kawasaki	10	(United Kingdom) Jason Meara	1–4, 7
Phoenix Evenstrokes Kawasaki	Kawasaki	152	(Bulgaria) Petar Petrov	All
FUS Marsh Geartec Husqvarna UK	Husqvarna	14	(United Kingdom) Luke Burton	1
Norman Watt Motorcycles	Kawasaki	17	(United Kingdom) Luke Smith	1–2, 4–5, 8
Chambers Racing	Husqvarna	20	(United Kingdom) Ben Putnam	1–2
Chambers Racing	Husqvarna	311	(United Kingdom) Aaron McCarroll	3
Chambers Racing	Husqvarna	337	(United Kingdom) Glenn McCormick	All
	KTM	22	(United Kingdom) Richard McKeown	1–4, 6
Gabriel KTM fuelled by Dyce Carriers	KTM	24	(United Kingdom) Shaun Simpson	1
SS24 KTM	KTM	24	(United Kingdom) Shaun Simpson	2–8
Dixon Honda Racing	Honda	38	(United Kingdom) Gavin Stevenson	3, 5–7
Site Sealants/Dyce Carriers KTM	KTM	41	(South Africa) Tristan Purdon	5–7
Geartec Husqvarna	Husqvarna	44	(United Kingdom) Elliott Banks-Browne	1–3
Crendon Fastrack Honda	Honda	45	(United Kingdom) Jake Nicholls	1–3
Crendon Fastrack Honda	Honda	100	(United Kingdom) Tommy Searle	All
Crendon Fastrack Honda	Honda	277	(United Kingdom) Jay Hague	6
Matt Pope Motorcycles	Gas Gas	49	(United Kingdom) Luke Parker	3, 5
Apico Husqvarna	Husqvarna	50	(United Kingdom) Martin Barr	All
Apico Husqvarna	Husqvarna	162	(Republic of Ireland) Stuart Edmonds	1–4, 8
Revo Seven Kawasaki	Kawasaki	53	(New Zealand) Dylan Walsh	1–2
3C Designs FIR Honda	Honda	57	(United Kingdom) Tony Craig	1
Norman Watt Kawasaki	Kawasaki	60	(United Kingdom) John Meara	2
Holeshot Kawasaki	Kawasaki	62	(United Kingdom) Charlie Way	7
SPH Groundworks	Husqvarna	69	(United Kingdom) Aidan Wigger	1–4
Astrax	Husqvarna	77	(United Kingdom) Alfie Smith	3
SC Sporthomes Husqvarna	Husqvarna	91	(United Kingdom) Charlie Putnam	All
SC Sporthomes Husqvarna	Husqvarna	326	(United Kingdom) Josh Gilbert	All
Cab Screens Crescent Yamaha	Yamaha	95	(United Kingdom) Dan Thornhill	1, 3–8
Cab Screens Crescent Yamaha	Yamaha	151	(Estonia) Harri Kullas	All
Cab Screens Crescent Yamaha	Yamaha	365	(United Kingdom) Sam Nunn	8
Eastwood Racing Suspension	Honda	103	(United Kingdom) Max Broadbelt	1, 3–5, 8
Torbay MX	Kawasaki	110	(United Kingdom) Ben Clayton	8
Judd Racing	Gas Gas	114	(United Kingdom) Joe Clayton	8
TALK Templant powered by Multitek	KTM	115	(United Kingdom) Ashton Dickinson	1–2
	KTM	118	(United Kingdom) Kieran Clarke	4
ANSA Racing Team	KTM	127	(United Kingdom) Scooter Webster	6–7
Gabriel KTM	KTM	134	(United Kingdom) Liam Knight	All
Gabriel KTM	KTM	714	(United Kingdom) Brad Todd	All
Brenron Shaw Molson Honda	Honda	150	(United Kingdom) Aaron Patstone	3
Torbay MX	Yamaha	166	(United Kingdom) Josh Taylor	2–3
GH Motorcycles	Husqvarna	190	(United Kingdom) Luke Benstead	4
CI Sport Kawasaki	Kawasaki	211	(United Kingdom) Billy MacKenzie	1–7
AJP Gas Gas	Gas Gas	211	(Zimbabwe) Jayden Ashwell	1–4
Herts MX/Honda UK	Honda	301	(United Kingdom) Shaun Southgate	3, 5
Verde Shiloh KTM	KTM	303	(United Kingdom) Jake Millward	1–5
Lings	Gas Gas	411	(United Kingdom) Declan Whittle	3, 5
Destination MX/Fisk Fire	Husqvarna	425	(United Kingdom) Drew Anderson	1–5, 7–8
426 Motorsport Stebbings KTM	KTM	426	(United Kingdom) Conrad Mewse	8
K&M Global Yamaha	Yamaha	491	(United Kingdom) George Simmutch	1–3
Store 114 Racing	Husqvarna	511	(United Kingdom) Steven Clarke	2–3
Team Ando PBM Honda	Honda	600	(United Kingdom) Brad Anderson	7
PGVM/Pukinn/Arctic Trucks	Yamaha	611	(Iceland) Eyþór Reynisson	5
KST Racing/RSE Racing	Kawasaki	689	(United Kingdom) Josh Bentley	3
Foxwood Trade/AU7 Burger Van Racing	KTM	711	(United Kingdom) James Cottrell	3
Team Hutch	KTM	717	(United Kingdom) James Hutchinson	7
	KTM	772	(United Kingdom) Elliot Reeves	4
	Husqvarna	911	(United Kingdom) Kelvin Townsend	8

=== Riders Championship ===
Pos	Rider	Bike	CUL (England)		FOX (England)		LYN (England)		CAN (England)		BLA (England)		FAT (England)		SKE (England)		LAN (England)		Points
1	(United Kingdom) Tommy Searle	Honda	1	1	3	1	2	1	1	1	4	3	2	1	2	1	2	4	364
2	(Estonia) Harri Kullas	Yamaha	5	4	1	2	1	2	2	3	1	2	1	2	1	3	1	2	356
3	(United Kingdom) Shaun Simpson	KTM	3	3	5	5	3	5	4	4	2	1	4	4	3	2	5	5	301
4	(United Kingdom) Josh Gilbert	Husqvarna	15	2	2	4	4	4	3	2	3	4	18	3	7	4	3	1	284
5	(United Kingdom) John Adamson	Gas Gas	6	12	11	11	20	6	6	5	5	8	3	5	5	5	7	10	213
6	(United Kingdom) Brad Todd	KTM	8	8	7	6	10	30	8	6	8	5	8	7	17	16	6	6	189
7	(United Kingdom) Liam Knight	KTM	10	10	10	8	7	8	12	17	14	6	7	9	11	7	11	11	179
8	(United Kingdom) Martin Barr	Husqvarna	11	17	8	9	27	9	9	7	7	Ret	5	8	4	6	10	9	176
9	(Bulgaria) Petar Petrov	Kawasaki	12	11	12	12	12	10	7	Ret	9	7	9	19	6	10	12	Ret	146
10	(United Kingdom) Glenn McCormick	Husqvarna	18	15	9	10	11	20	11	12	12	17	14	10	12	13	19	12	121
11	(United Kingdom) Dan Thornhill	Yamaha	DNS	DNS			19	19	13	10	11	10	10	11	10	9	9	7	114
12	(United Kingdom) Jake Millward	KTM	2	7	Ret	16	6	7	5	Ret	6	9							113
13	(Republic of Ireland) Stuart Edmonds	Husqvarna	9	20	13	17	8	Ret	15	8							8	8	83
14	(United Kingdom) Jake Nicholls	Honda	13	5	17	7	5	3											78
15	(South Africa) Tristan Purdon	KTM									10	14	6	6	8	11			71
16	(United Kingdom) Ashton Dickinson	KTM	4	9	6	3													65
17	(United Kingdom) Jason Meara	Kawasaki	Ret	13	21	19	16	11	10	9					14	14			62
18	(United Kingdom) Charlie Putnam	Husqvarna	23	Ret	16	20	24	17	Ret	16	Ret	16	15	14	13	15	15	15	60
19	(United Kingdom) Billy MacKenzie	Kawasaki	24	24	24	18	Ret	18	Ret	14	17	11	11	18	9	12			54
20	(New Zealand) Dylan Walsh	Kawasaki	7	6	4	15													53
21	(United Kingdom) Gavin Stevenson	Honda					13	12			19	13	12	12	Ret	DNS			45
22	(United Kingdom) Conrad Mewse	KTM															4	3	38
23	(United Kingdom) Jack Brunell	Gas Gas					17	22	14	13	16	15							30
24	(United Kingdom) Luke Smith	Kawasaki	Ret	25	20	22			18	15	22	18					14	17	25
25	(United Kingdom) Ben Edwards	KTM					18	24					13	13	18	19			24
26	(Zimbabwe) Jayden Ashwell	Gas Gas	20	21	22	21	14	13	19	18									22
27	(United Kingdom) Shaun Southgate	Honda					15	14			13	Ret							21
28	(United Kingdom) Richard McKeown	KTM	21	23	19	23	21	21	17	19			16	15					20
29	(United Kingdom) Drew Anderson	Husqvarna	22	19	Ret	DNS	26	23	20	20	Ret	20			19	17	16	18	20
30	(United Kingdom) Brad Anderson	Honda													15	8			19
31	(United Kingdom) Steven Clarke	Husqvarna			Ret	14	9	Ret											19
32	(United Kingdom) Luke Benstead	Husqvarna							16	11									15
33	(United Kingdom) Luke Parker	Gas Gas					22	DNS			15	12							15
34	(United Kingdom) John Meara	Kawasaki			14	13													15
35	(United Kingdom) George Simmutch	Yamaha	16	22	18	24	Ret	15											14
36	(United Kingdom) Joe Clayton	Gas Gas															13	16	13
37	(United Kingdom) Scooter Webster	KTM											17	16	20	18			13
38	(United Kingdom) Ben Putnam	Husqvarna	17	18	15	Ret													13
39	(United Kingdom) Sam Nunn	Yamaha															17	13	12
40	(United Kingdom) Louie Kessell	Honda															20	14	8
41	(United Kingdom) Elliott Banks-Browne	Husqvarna	14	Ret	25	25	Ret	Ret											8
42	(United Kingdom) Luke Burton	Husqvarna	Ret	14															7
43	(United Kingdom) Tony Craig	Honda	19	16															7
44	(United Kingdom) Jay Hague	Honda											19	17					6
45	(United Kingdom) James Hutchinson	KTM													16	20			6
46	(United Kingdom) Alfie Smith	Husqvarna					23	16											5
47	(United Kingdom) Kelvin Townsend	Husqvarna															18	20	4
48	(Iceland) Eyþór Reynisson	Yamaha									18	Ret							3
49	(United Kingdom) Declan Whittle	Gas Gas					28	Ret			20	19							3
50	(United Kingdom) Ben Clayton	Kawasaki															Ret	19	2
	(United Kingdom) Max Broadbelt	Honda	Ret	26			Ret	27	21	21	21	Ret					DNS	DNS	0
	(United Kingdom) Elliot Reeves	KTM							22	22									0
	(United Kingdom) Josh Taylor	Yamaha			23	26	30	26											0
	(United Kingdom) Aaron McCarroll	Husqvarna					29	25											0
	(United Kingdom) Josh Bentley	Kawasaki					25	Ret											0
	(United Kingdom) Aidan Wigger	Husqvarna	Ret	27	26	Ret	32	29	DNS	DNS									0
	(United Kingdom) Aaron Patstone	Honda					31	28											0
	(United Kingdom) James Cottrell	KTM					Ret	DNS											0
	(United Kingdom) Kieran Clarke	KTM							Ret	DNS									0
	(United Kingdom) Charlie Way	Kawasaki													Ret	DNS			0
Pos	Rider	Bike	CUL (England)		FOX (England)		LYN (England)		CAN (England)		BLA (England)		FAT (England)		SKE (England)		LAN (England)		Points

== MX2 ==
=== Participants ===
Team	Constructor	No	Rider	Rounds
IDS Transport Yamaha	Yamaha	4	(United Kingdom) Robert Yates	1
Phoenix Evenstrokes Kawasaki	Kawasaki	6	(United Kingdom) Carlton Husband	1–4, 6–8
Phoenix Evenstrokes Kawasaki	Kawasaki	60	(United Kingdom) John Meara	5
Phoenix Evenstrokes Kawasaki	Kawasaki	127	(United Kingdom) Sam Atkinson	1–2, 5–8
KES Commercials St Blazey Honda	Honda	7	(United Kingdom) Louie Kessell	1–5
Store 114/Harris Grab KTM	KTM	10	(United Kingdom) Michael Ellis	All
SB Windows Ltd	Husqvarna	11	(United Kingdom) Matt Burrows	2
Chambers Racing	Husqvarna	16	(United Kingdom) Tom Grimshaw	All
Chambers Racing	Husqvarna	120	(United Kingdom) Ben Putnam	3–4
Chambers Racing	Husqvarna	300	(United Kingdom) Ben Franklin	6–8
Chambers Racing	Husqvarna	731	(United Kingdom) Alfie Jones	All
Darjen Gas Gas	Gas Gas	17	(United Kingdom) Matt Bayliss	4–5
PW Racing/SPBM	KTM	18	(United Kingdom) Ricky Carter	3
	Husqvarna	19	(United Kingdom) Tom Neal	7
Southside MX	KTM	20	(United Kingdom) William Farrow	1, 3–5
TALK Templant Racing Team	KTM	22	(United Kingdom) Travis Steels	3–8
Holeshot MX/Turvey Construction	Kawasaki	24	(United Kingdom) Liam Garland	7–8
Apico Husqvarna	Husqvarna	25	(United Kingdom) Jamie Law	All
Apico Husqvarna	Husqvarna	433	(United Kingdom) Jack Lindsay	1–7
Fabrican Race Team	KTM	32	(United Kingdom) Calum Mitchell	All
Hitachi KTM fuelled by Milwaukee	KTM	33	(Netherlands) Kay Karssemakers	2, 4–6, 8
Hitachi KTM fuelled by Milwaukee	KTM	517	(Sweden) Isak Gifting	1–2, 4–5
Whites Transport Services	KTM	38	(United Kingdom) Ben White	2
Revo Seven Kawasaki	Kawasaki	40	(United Kingdom) Jamie Wainwright	1–5
Revo Seven Kawasaki	Kawasaki	53	(New Zealand) Dylan Walsh	3–8
Moto-Cycle/Premier Bikes	KTM	48	(United Kingdom) Adam Collings	All
CPS Motorcycles/Chambers Racing	Husqvarna	54	(United Kingdom) Dylan Spencer	1–5, 7–8
	KTM	55	(South Africa) Damon Strydom	5
Verde Shiloh KTM	KTM	57	(United Kingdom) Kyle McNichol	1–2
Verde Shiloh KTM	KTM	119	(United Kingdom) Bailey Johnston	1–2, 5–8
Norman Watt Motorcycles	Kawasaki	60	(United Kingdom) John Meara	7
	Yamaha	66	(United Kingdom) Lewis Tombs	3, 5
Gabriel KTM	KTM	74	(United Kingdom) Tom Murphy	1–7
723 Racebikes/Westole Fencing	KTM	75	(United Kingdom) Aaron Ongley	1–6
Blades Bikes	Kawasaki	82	(United Kingdom) Charlie Cole	All
HRW Racing/Wulfsport	Yamaha	99	(United Kingdom) Howard Wainwright	1–2, 4
BPH Race Team	Yamaha	101	(United Kingdom) Ben Kennedy	1, 5
Hardcore Racing	Yamaha	111	(United Kingdom) Rob Holyoake	1, 5, 7
	KTM	118	(United Kingdom) Jaydon Murphy	2
RSR Plant Services KTM	KTM	122	(Republic of Ireland) Jake Sheridan	All
Lexa MX	Husqvarna	123	(United Kingdom) Rossi Beard	2–4
Holeshot MX/SE Racing	KTM	131	(United Kingdom) Henry Siddiqui	1–4, 7
Oil Collect/Rikki Priest	KTM	133	(United Kingdom) Jordan Wright	1
JSMX Coaching	KTM	180	(United Kingdom) Josh Spinks	4–5
GRT Impact KTM	KTM	184	(United Kingdom) James Carpenter	All
SC Sporthomes Husqvarna	Husqvarna	247	(France) Florian Miot	1–5
SC Sporthomes Husqvarna	Husqvarna	261	(Estonia) Jörgen-Matthias Talviku	6–8
Husqvarna Lille Vitamine H	Husqvarna	249	(France) Mathéo Miot	2
	Yamaha	260	(United Kingdom) Dylan Woodcock	4
SR75 Suzuki	Suzuki	272	(South Africa) Neville Bradshaw	1
RJP Motorcycles/CI Sport	Yamaha	272	(South Africa) Neville Bradshaw	3–4
Meredith MX	Fantic	274	(United Kingdom) Kieran Banks	1
Crendon Fastrack Honda	Honda	277	(United Kingdom) Jay Hague	1–2, 5
CI Sport MX/Destination MX KTM	KTM	326	(United Kingdom) Wal Beaney	1–5
RFX Whites Transport KTM	KTM	360	(United Kingdom) Nathan Dixon	1
Cab Screens Crescent Yamaha	Yamaha	365	(United Kingdom) Sam Nunn	1, 4–7
SJP Moto	KTM	422	(United Kingdom) Charlie Heyman	8
426 Motorsport Stebbings KTM	KTM	426	(United Kingdom) Conrad Mewse	1–7
	Gas Gas	469	(Netherlands) Ryan de Beer	4
MotoXChange	Husqvarna	470	(United Kingdom) Tom Hughes	2, 4–6, 8
	KTM	500	(United Kingdom) Callum Murfitt	3
Big Van World MTX Kawasaki	Kawasaki	575	(United Kingdom) Taylor Hammal	1
ASA United Gas Gas	Gas Gas	579	(United Kingdom) Bobby Bruce	7–8
Team Ando PBM Honda	Honda	600	(United Kingdom) Brad Anderson	4
	KTM	661	(United States) Noah Chambers	4
Fathead Racing	Husqvarna	681	(United Kingdom) Tommy Alba	6
AJP Gas Gas	Gas Gas	719	(United Kingdom) Jimmy Margetson	6
MV Haulage/Stebbings	KTM	771	(United Kingdom) Ollie Beamish	1, 3–5
	Gas Gas	818	(United Kingdom) Shaun Springer	4
FUS Marsh Geartec Husqvarna	Husqvarna	957	(United Kingdom) Jake Preston	1, 4–5
Drag'On Tek Yamaha	Yamaha	998	(United Kingdom) Todd Kellett	6

=== Riders Championship ===
Pos	Rider	Bike	CUL (England)		FOX (England)		LYN (England)		CAN (England)		BLA (England)		FAT (England)		SKE (England)		LAN (England)		Points
1	(United Kingdom) Conrad Mewse	KTM	1	1	1	11	1	1	Ret	DNS	2	2	1	1	1	2			276
2	(United Kingdom) James Carpenter	KTM	15	4	4	1	7	16	6	7	4	3	5	4	2	7	2	1	270
3	(United Kingdom) Tom Grimshaw	Husqvarna	21	8	7	2	5	4	5	6	5	4	7	14	15	4	4	9	223
4	(United Kingdom) Jamie Law	Husqvarna	5	5	11	9	3	3	13	9	11	11	6	9	9	8	15	11	202
5	(Sweden) Isak Gifting	KTM	2	2	2	3			1	1	1	1							186
6	(New Zealand) Dylan Walsh	Kawasaki					2	2	2	2	Ret	Ret	Ret	DNS	3	1	1	2	180
7	(United Kingdom) Adam Collings	KTM	16	15	6	8	6	7	10	Ret	16	8	9	5	7	13	8	7	174
8	(United Kingdom) Calum Mitchell	KTM	12	16	12	23	13	9	11	11	10	10	8	6	8	11	11	8	159
9	(Netherlands) Kay Karssemakers	KTM			3	4			3	3	3	5	3	3			Ret	DNS	154
10	(United Kingdom) Michael Ellis	KTM	11	10	5	14	15	6	18	26	6	7	Ret	Ret	11	6	10	15	139
11	(United Kingdom) Charlie Cole	Kawasaki	Ret	11	10	Ret	4	8	7	Ret	12	24	11	10	10	15	12	6	137
12	(United Kingdom) Carlton Husband	Kawasaki	14	9	9	7	8	26	DNS	DNS			12	21	12	5	14	5	115
13	(Estonia) Jörgen-Matthias Talviku	Husqvarna											2	2	4	14	3	3	109
14	(United Kingdom) Jamie Wainwright	Kawasaki	29	7	14	12	19	12	8	4	14	6							94
15	(United Kingdom) Alfie Jones	Husqvarna	13	20	17	15	29	11	12	Ret	32	12	15	11	17	21	6	14	89
16	(Republic of Ireland) Jake Sheridan	KTM	24	19	21	19	11	13	19	13	18	16	Ret	17	13	12	9	16	78
17	(United Kingdom) Sam Atkinson	Kawasaki	32	27	16	10					20	17	10	15	Ret	18	7	12	64
18	(United Kingdom) Jay Hague	Honda	3	Ret	8	5					8	20							63
19	(United Kingdom) Sam Nunn	Yamaha	30	Ret					21	15	Ret	9	13	13	5	9			62
20	(United Kingdom) Ben Putnam	Husqvarna					10	10	4	8									53
21	(United Kingdom) Lewis Tombs	Yamaha					9	5			9	13							48
22	(South Africa) Neville Bradshaw	Suzuki	9	14															38
22	(South Africa) Neville Bradshaw	Yamaha					14	DNS	9	Ret									38
23	(United Kingdom) Josh Spinks	KTM							14	5	7	Ret							37
24	(United Kingdom) John Meara	Kawasaki									17	14			16	3			36
25	(United Kingdom) Jack Lindsay	Husqvarna	17	25	19	25	12	14	28	21	15	21	21	19	20	17			35
26	(United Kingdom) Charlie Heyman	KTM															5	4	34
27	(United Kingdom) Kyle McNichol	KTM	10	3	22	20													32
28	(United Kingdom) Todd Kellett	Yamaha											4	7					32
29	(France) Florian Miot	Husqvarna	4	DNS	Ret	DNS	Ret	DNS	Ret	Ret	13	15							32
30	(United Kingdom) Ben Franklin	Husqvarna											14	8	Ret	19	20	13	31
31	(United Kingdom) Taylor Hammal	Kawasaki	6	6															30
32	(United Kingdom) Bailey Johnston	KTM	19	28	25	16					21	19	17	Ret	14	16	17	20	30
33	(United Kingdom) Tom Murphy	KTM	31	17	23	21	16	19	23	14	Ret	26	16	16	19	24			30
34	(United Kingdom) Bobby Bruce	Gas Gas													6	10	Ret	DNS	26
35	(United Kingdom) Aaron Ongley	KTM	27	22	20	22	17	17	16	16	22	30	19	18					24
36	(France) Mathéo Miot	Husqvarna			13	6													23
37	(United Kingdom) Robert Yates	Yamaha	7	12															23
38	(United Kingdom) Howard Wainwright	Yamaha	18	13	15	17			Ret	DNS									21
39	(United Kingdom) Travis Steels	KTM					21	18	17	20	29	27	20	20	23	20	16	17	20
40	(United Kingdom) Louie Kessell	Honda	20	18	DSQ	13	22	20	25	17	Ret	18							20
41	(United Kingdom) Liam Garland	Kawasaki													Ret	Ret	13	10	19
42	(United Kingdom) Brad Anderson	Honda							15	10									17
43	(United Kingdom) Nathan Dixon	KTM	8	Ret															13
44	(United Kingdom) Matt Bayliss	Gas Gas							20	12	19	Ret							12
45	(United Kingdom) Tommy Alba	Husqvarna											18	12					12
46	(United Kingdom) Rossi Beard	Husqvarna			26	24	18	15	Ret	25									9
47	(United Kingdom) Dylan Spencer	Husqvarna	28	29	27	27	25	22	29	Ret	28	Ret			22	23	18	18	6
48	(United Kingdom) Henry Siddiqui	KTM	Ret	DNS	18	18	27	Ret	27	Ret					Ret	22			6
49	(United Kingdom) Tom Hughes	Husqvarna			29	Ret			34	27	Ret	31	Ret	Ret			19	19	4
50	(United Kingdom) Jake Preston	Husqvarna	23	24					24	18	31	DNS							3
51	(United Kingdom) Wal Beaney	KTM	26	23	24	26	20	21	32	19	26	25							3
52	(United Kingdom) Robert Holyoake	Yamaha	22	Ret							25	22			18	Ret			3
	(United Kingdom) Kieran Banks	Fantic	25	21															0
	(United Kingdom) Tom Neal	Yamaha													21	Ret			0
	(United Kingdom) Ollie Beamish	KTM	35	26			23	23	26	22	24	29							0
	(United Kingdom) Dylan Woodcock	Yamaha							22	Ret									0
	(United Kingdom) William Farrow	KTM	Ret	30			28	24	31	23	23	28							0
	(South Africa) Damon Strydom	KTM									27	23							0
	(United Kingdom) Callum Murfitt	KTM					24	25											0
	(United States) Noah Chambers	KTM							30	24									0
	(United Kingdom) Ricky Carter	KTM					26	27											0
	(United Kingdom) Ben White	KTM			28	28													0
	(United Kingdom) Jaydon Murphy	KTM			Ret	29													0
	(United Kingdom) Ben Kennedy	Yamaha	33	DNS							30	DNS							0
	(Netherlands) Ryan de Beer	Gas Gas							33	DNS									0
	(United Kingdom) Matt Burrows	Husqvarna			Ret	Ret													0
	(United Kingdom) Jordan Wright	KTM	Ret	DNS															0
	(United Kingdom) Shaun Springer	Gas Gas							Ret	DNS									0
	(United Kingdom) Jimmy Margetson	Gas Gas											Ret	DNS					0
Pos	Rider	Bike	CUL (England)		FOX (England)		LYN (England)		CAN (England)		BLA (England)		FAT (England)		SKE (England)		LAN (England)		Points
