= 2007 FIM Motocross World Championship =

Motocross championship season

2007 Motocross World Championship

Seasons
- ← 2006 2008 →

The 2007 FIM Motocross World Championship was the 51st F.I.M. Motocross Racing World Championship season. In the MX1 class, Steve Ramon took his second world title despite not winning a Grand Prix all season. In the MX2 class Tony Cairoli also won his second world title, while in MX3 Yves Demaria won his third and final world championship.

== MX1 ==
=== Calendar and Results ===
Round	Date	Grand Prix	Location	Race 1 Winner	Race 2 Winner	Round Winner
MX1
1	April 1	Netherlands	Valkenswaard	(New Zealand) Josh Coppins	(Spain) Jonathan Barragan	(New Zealand) Josh Coppins
2	April 15	Spain	Bellpuig	(New Zealand) Josh Coppins	(New Zealand) Josh Coppins	(New Zealand) Josh Coppins
3	April 22	Portugal	Águeda	(New Zealand) Josh Coppins	(Belgium) Kevin Strijbos	(New Zealand) Josh Coppins
4	May 6	Italy	Mantova	(New Zealand) Josh Coppins	(New Zealand) Josh Coppins	(New Zealand) Josh Coppins
5	May 13	Germany	Teutschenthal	(New Zealand) Josh Coppins	(Italy) David Philippaerts	(Italy) David Philippaerts
6	May 27	Japan	Sugo	(United Kingdom) Billy MacKenzie	(United States) Mike Brown	(United Kingdom) Billy MacKenzie
7	June 10	France	St Jean d'Angély	(New Zealand) Josh Coppins	(Belgium) Steve Ramon	(New Zealand) Josh Coppins
8	June 17	Bulgaria	Sevlievo	(Spain) Jonathan Barragan	(New Zealand) Joshua Coppins	(New Zealand) Joshua Coppins
9	July 1	Sweden	Uddevalla	(Belgium) Ken De Dycker	(Belgium) Steve Ramon	(Belgium) Ken De Dycker
10	July 15	Italy	Faenza	(France) Sébastien Pourcel	(France) Sébastien Pourcel	(France) Sébastien Pourcel
11	July 29	Czech Republic	Loket	(Belgium) Kevin Strijbos	(Belgium) Kevin Strijbos	(Belgium) Kevin Strijbos
12	August 5	Belgium	Namur	(France) Sébastien Pourcel	(Italy) David Philippaerts	(France) Sébastien Pourcel
13	August 19	Northern Ireland	Moneyglass	(Belgium) Ken De Dycker	(Belgium) Kevin Strijbos	(Belgium) Kevin Strijbos
14	August 26	United Kingdom	Donington Park	(Belgium) Kevin Strijbos	(Italy) Tony Cairoli	(Italy) Tony Cairoli
15	September 2	Netherlands	Lierop	(Belgium) Kevin Strijbos	(Netherlands) Marc de Reuver	(Belgium) Kevin Strijbos

=== Entry list ===
Full-Time Teams & Riders
Team	Constructor	No	Rider	Rounds
WMX GP Suzuki	Suzuki	2	(Belgium) Kevin Strijbos	1–7, 9–15
WMX GP Suzuki	Suzuki	11	(Belgium) Steve Ramon	All
CAS Honda	Honda	4	(United States) Mike Brown	All
CAS Honda	Honda	9	(Belgium) Ken De Dycker	All
Kawasaki Racing Team Europe	Kawasaki	5	(Estonia) Tanel Leok	All
Kawasaki Racing Team Europe	Kawasaki	211	(United Kingdom) Billy MacKenzie	All
Yamaha Motocross Team	Yamaha	6	(New Zealand) Josh Coppins	1–11, 14
Yamaha Motocross Team	Yamaha	14	(Netherlands) Marc de Reuver	All
Red Bull KTM	KTM	7	(Spain) Jonathan Barragan	All
Red Bull KTM	KTM	19	(Italy) David Philippaerts	All
TM Racing Factory Team	TM	8	(Belgium) Manuel Priem	All
Team Aprilia Off-Road	Aprilia	10	(Belgium) Cedric Melotte	4–5, 7–15
Team Aprilia Off-Road	Aprilia	121	(Italy) Alessio Chiodi	1–4, 7–15
PAR Honda	Honda	13	(Republic of Ireland) Gordon Crockard	1–2, 4–12
PAR Honda	Honda	73	(United Kingdom) Wayne Smith	12, 14–15
PAR Honda	Honda	74	(South Africa) Neville Bradshaw	7, 10, 14
Moto Race Team	WRM	15	(Italy) Christian Beggi	1–5, 7–8, 10–12
Moto Race Team	Yamaha	35	(Italy) Christian Stevanini	4–5, 7–8, 10
Multitek Honda	Honda	16	(United Kingdom) James Noble	All
CLS Kawasaki	Kawasaki	18	(France) Thomas Allier	1–10, 13–15
MTM Racing Team	Suzuki	21	(Belgium) Danny Theybers	6–15
MTM Racing Team	Suzuki	76	(Sweden) Marcus Norlen	1–5
MTM Racing Team	Suzuki	77	(Netherlands) Bas Verhoeven	1–3
Van Beers Racing	Yamaha	22	(Latvia) Lauris Freibergs	2, 4–5, 7–15
Van Beers Racing	Yamaha	111	(Estonia) Aigar Leok	1–5, 7–11, 13–15
3C Racing	Yamaha	23	(Italy) Alex Salvini	1–5, 9–15
Team NGS	Honda	24	(France) Pierre Renet	1–5, 7–15
Inotec Ortema Suzuki	Suzuki	25	(Belgium) Clement Desalle	1–5, 7–15
Inotec Ortema Suzuki	Suzuki	59	(Austria) Oswald Reisinger	5, 11
Kovalainen Racing Oy	Honda	26	(Finland) Marko Kovalainen	1–5, 7, 9, 11–12, 14–15
Martin Honda	Honda	28	(France) Antoine Meo	1–4
Martin Honda	Honda	29	(Switzerland) Julien Bill	7–15
Delta Kawasaki	Kawasaki	29	(Switzerland) Julien Bill	1–5
DMU Motocross Team	Yamaha	31	(Denmark) Kasper Jensen	2–4, 7–12
HDI Motorsport	Honda	32	(France) Julien Vanni	1–5, 7–8, 12
HDI Motorsport	Honda	33	(France) Cyrille Coulon	1–5, 7–15
HDI Motorsport	Honda	199	(France) Timotei Potisek	15
TEKA Suzuki	Suzuki	38	(Russia) Dmitry Parshin	1–3, 15
TEKA Suzuki	Suzuki	92	(New Zealand) Scott Columb	2–8
TEKA Suzuki	Suzuki	108	(Hungary) Kornel Nemeth	All
Team KTM Errevi	KTM	39	(Italy) Daniele Bricca	1–4
Medei Motocross Team	Kawasaki	51	(Italy) Matteo Dottori	1–4, 10
Medei Motocross Team	Kawasaki	71	(Finland) Antti Pyrhonen	1–5
Sarholz KTM	KTM	57	(Germany) Andreas Huber	5
Sarholz KTM	KTM	101	(Germany) Max Nagl	1–7, 12, 15
Shineray MX Team China	Honda	75	(Belgium) Marvin van Daele	1–5, 7–15
Team GPKR	Kawasaki	90	(France) Sebastien Pourcel	All
Wild Card Teams & Riders
Team	Constructor	No	Rider	Rounds
LS Honda	Honda	21	(Belgium) Danny Theybers	3
Team Wulfsport Kawasaki	Kawasaki	34	(United Kingdom) Mark Jones	13–15
Auto Dream Bakel	Yamaha	36	(Netherlands) William Saris	15
Team Taxi Marcel	Suzuki	37	(Belgium) Jonas Salaets	12
Suzuki Importcross	Suzuki	40	(Spain) Joan Barreda	2, 7
Sturm Racing Team	Kawasaki	42	(United States) Bradley Graham	7–11
Eurotank Racing Team	Honda	43	(Finland) Eero Remes	1, 5, 9, 13–14
Team Suzuki Japan	Suzuki	44	(Japan) Yohei Kojima	12–15
Team Suzuki Japan	Suzuki	65	(Japan) Kuraudo Toda	6
Team Suzuki Japan	Suzuki	67	(Japan) Yoshiki Kitai	6
JK Racing	Yamaha	45	(France) Loic Leonce	9–12, 14
Heli Motors Honda	Honda	46	(Netherlands) Anne Advokaat	1
Pater MX Team	KTM	47	(Netherlands) Heikki van den Berg	15
Van de Wetering MX Team	Honda	49	(Netherlands) Patrick Roos	1, 15
LF Sport Yamaha	Yamaha	54	(Portugal) Hugo Santos	3
HVM Kawasaki Cepsa	Kawasaki	55	(Portugal) Henrique Venda	3
Motogarrano Repsol Honda	Honda	56	(Portugal) Paulo Gonçalves	3
Team Silent Sport	Suzuki	58	(Germany) Dennis Schröter	5, 15
Pioneer Yamaha	Yamaha	60	(United Kingdom) Brad Anderson	5, 7, 12–14
Green Club - Park Kohbe	Kawasaki	61	(Japan) Hiroki Ogawa	6
Green Club - Park Kohbe	Kawasaki	80	(Japan) Masaki Hiratsuka	6
Jubilo Racing Team	Yamaha	62	(Japan) Shinobu Idehara	6
Jubilo Racing Team	Yamaha	63	(Japan) Taichi Kugimura	6
Jubilo Racing Team	Yamaha	88	(Japan) Akira Narita	6
SRF K&S Suzuki	Suzuki	68	(Japan) Shinichi Kaga	6
MX Shop Racing Team	KTM	70	(Sweden) Jonny Lindhe	1, 9–12
Stabilo Pro Grip Team	Honda	77	(Netherlands) Bas Verhoeven	7–14
MX Team Ritter	Suzuki	79	(Slovenia) Jaka Moze	11
	Kawasaki	81	(Bulgaria) Nikolay Kumanov	8
Team HRC	Honda	82	(Japan) Kazumasa Masuda	6
Team HRC	Honda	83	(Japan) Yoshitaka Atsuta	6
Ohkawara Racing	Yamaha	84	(Japan) Kohiji Ohkawara	6
Team Judgement	Honda	85	(Japan) Seiji Numata	6
Honda Dream Racing Team	Honda	86	(Japan) Ryuichiro Takahama	6
Team HAMMER Honda	Honda	87	(Japan) Makoto Ogata	6
	KTM	91	(Bulgaria) Rosen Tonchev	8
	Suzuki	94	(France) Raphael Beaudouin	7
	Yamaha	96	(Bulgaria) Boncho Avramov	8
	Kawasaki	98	(Sweden) Bjorn Andersson	9
Team HCT Tool Suzuki	Suzuki	99	(Denmark) Bo Vang Jensen	9
	Kawasaki	102	(Sweden) Jonas Algotsson	9
Team Promo Suzuki	Suzuki	103	(Sweden) Karl Karlsson	9
Team Yamaha Sweden	Yamaha	104	(Sweden) Magnus Lindhe	9
	KTM	105	(Czech Republic) Jiri Cepelak	11–12
Team Orange KTM	KTM	106	(Italy) Marco Casucci	10
Team Moto One In Touch	KTM	107	(United Kingdom) Wayne Garrett	13
Ricci Racing	Yamaha	112	(Norway) Kenneth Gundersen	13
	Yamaha	114	(France) Arnaud Demeester	15
Schmierstoff MX Team	Honda	120	(Czech Republic) Michal Kadlecek	11
Ihle Racing Team	Kawasaki	131	(Czech Republic) Martin Michek	1
Ihle Racing Team	Honda	131	(Czech Republic) Martin Michek	11
Brouwer Motors KTM	KTM	153	(Republic of Ireland) Richard McKeown	13–15
Max Team	Honda	163	(Italy) Simone Ricci	10
Van Gorp Racing	Suzuki	170	(Belgium) Jurgen Van Nooten	12
	Honda	381	(Canada) Mitchell Cooke	4
Team 2SP Racing	Suzuki	511	(Italy) Stefano Dami	4

=== Riders Championship ===
Pos	Rider	Bike	BEN (Benelux)		ESP (Spain)		POR (Portugal)		ITA (Italy)		GER (Germany)		JPN (Japan)		FRA (France)		BUL (Bulgaria)		SWE (Sweden)		ITA (Italy)		CZE (Czech Republic)		BEL (Belgium)		NIR (Northern Ireland)		GBR (United Kingdom)		NED (Netherlands)		Points
1	(Belgium) Ramon	Suzuki	2	6	3	15	11	8	7	5	3	3	9	4	3	1	4	2	5	1	8	8	9	4	5	4	8	4	6	4	2	3	508
2	(Belgium) Strijbos	Suzuki	4	4	2	3	2	1	3	8	6	4	12	10	21	DNS			3	17	10	17	1	1	4	5	2	1	1	2	1	2	475
3	(New Zealand) Coppins	Yamaha	1	2	1	1	1	2	1	1	1	6	3	3	1	2	2	1	4	6	2	2	22	Ret					14	Ret			452
4	(France) Pourcel	Kawasaki	13	Ret	11	4	10	3	4	4	16	2	7	11	4	9	3	4	8	Ret	1	1	6	2	1	6	5	2	7	8	9	Ret	439
5	(Belgium) De Dycker	Honda	3	7	6	9	7	12	Ret	2	4	14	6	Ret	17	Ret	8	6	1	2	3	10	3	Ret	2	8	1	12	3	3	4	4	421
6	(Italy) Philippaerts	KTM	23	Ret	8	8	3	5	9	Ret	5	1	4	6	2	5	5	3	6	3	6	15	2	9	7	1	4	3	18	7	8	Ret	419
7	(United States) Brown	Honda	14	9	12	13	9	7	14	9	12	11	5	1	7	7	7	8	11	8	4	4	15	10	8	7	9	Ret	4	6	15	10	361
8	(Estonia) T. Leok	Kawasaki	11	14	9	7	4	Ret	2	6	13	15	Ret	7	8	3	11	11	2	5	12	7	5	5	6	2	Ret	Ret	5	5	Ret	7	355
9	(United Kingdom) MacKenzie	Kawasaki	9	21	20	5	16	9	6	23	27	9	1	2	5	4	Ret	Ret	7	4	9	3	7	6	3	17	7	5	8	16	5	5	351
10	(Spain) Barragan	KTM	5	1	4	6	13	14	Ret	10	14	7	2	Ret	6	6	1	5	9	7	5	5	Ret	3	Ret	9	3	Ret	10	9	Ret	DNS	347
11	(United Kingdom) Noble	Honda	10	8	10	16	5	16	5	7	8	Ret	10	8	10	Ret	13	15	10	10	11	11	14	11	11	20	Ret	11	12	12	10	13	270
12	(Hungary) Nemeth	Suzuki	8	Ret	7	Ret	8	10	10	Ret	19	19	14	14	11	12	9	12	12	9	19	12	21	20	16	12	10	9	11	13	22	14	215
13	(Belgium) Priem	TM	18	5	Ret	12	6	4	12	Ret	10	21	11	9	12	8	Ret	Ret	17	11	13	13	Ret	12	18	14	Ret	DNS	Ret	Ret	6	6	204
14	(Netherlands) de Reuver	Yamaha	6	3	14	10	14	Ret	23	3	2	8	Ret	DNS	Ret	21	12	9	DNQ	DNQ	DNQ	DNQ	10	24	DNQ	DNQ	12	Ret	Ret	DNS	3	1	201
15	(Switzerland) Bill	Kawasaki	DNQ	DNQ	Ret	18	17	Ret	15	19	Ret	Ret																					199
15	(Switzerland) Bill	Honda													15	11	6	Ret	13	Ret	7	6	4	7	10	3	6	6	9	10	Ret	21	199
16	(Belgium) van Daele	Honda	22	12	18	17	12	11	Ret	11	24	17			16	10	14	22	23	16	17	9	12	14	12	10	15	7	16	11	11	8	187
17	(France) Renet	Honda	16	13	Ret	Ret	Ret	15	Ret	14	18	12			Ret	13	24	Ret	15	13	16	21	8	8	9	11	11	8	13	15	14	Ret	157
18	(Germany) Nagl	KTM	7	10	5	2	Ret	DNS	DNS	DNS	9	16	15	12	9	Ret									DNQ	DNQ					7	9	133
19	(Estonia) A. Leok	Yamaha	12	Ret	16	14	21	13	13	13	20	10			14	14	Ret	19	18	Ret	18	16	13	Ret			20	14	24	Ret	12	11	119
20	(Belgium) Desalle	Suzuki	17	16	21	Ret	15	19	11	24	15	27			25	15	18	16	14	14	27	25	11	15	13	19	13	10	Ret	19	17	Ret	112
21	(Republic of Ireland) Crockard	Honda	24	11	22	Ret			8	12	7	5	18	16	13	Ret	20	14	16	12	24	19	Ret	Ret	DNS	DNS							102
22	(Italy) Salvini	Yamaha	Ret	Ret	17	Ret	Ret	Ret	16	Ret	17	22							20	15	14	14	Ret	13	17	Ret	16	13	15	17	Ret	16	74
23	(France) Allier	Kawasaki	DNQ	DNQ	15	11	Ret	6	Ret	17	22	13	Ret	19	24	Ret	16	10	Ret	Ret	DNQ	DNQ					Ret	Ret	17	Ret	DNQ	DNQ	65
24	(Italy) Cairoli	Yamaha																											2	1			47
25	(Belgium) Theybers	Honda					DNS	DNS																									44
25	(Belgium) Theybers	Suzuki											16	13	DNQ	DNQ	Ret	23	19	18	23	20	16	18	19	Ret	21	15	DNQ	23	16	17	44
26	(France) Vanni	Honda	Ret	15	DNQ	DNQ	18	22	22	25	Ret	18			23	16	10	7							Ret	DNS							42
27	(Italy) Chiodi	Aprilia	21	23	19	21	23	21	DNQ	DNQ					19	Ret	23	Ret	22	20	20	23	17	16	14	15	23	17	22	18	20	20	37
28	(Latvia) Freibergs	Yamaha			DNQ	DNQ			DNQ	DNQ	25	25			DNQ	DNQ	19	21	DNQ	DNQ	21	18	DNQ	DNQ	15	13	24	Ret	Ret	20	13	15	34
29	(United Kingdom) Anderson	Yamaha									11	20			18	Ret									Ret	18	18	18	19	14			32
30	(Japan) Atsuta	Honda											8	5																			29
31	(France) Coulon	Honda	DNQ	DNQ	13	23	19	18	24	22	26	26			20	20	15	17	24	25	25	Ret	25	Ret	Ret	Ret	17	Ret	DNQ	DNQ	24	22	29
32	(Belgium) Melotte	Aprilia							DNQ	Ret	DNQ	DNQ			Ret	Ret	Ret	18	DNQ	DNQ	Ret	DNS	19	17	Ret	16	Ret	Ret	25	26	18	12	26
33	(New Zealand) Columb	Suzuki			24	19	DNQ	DNQ	21	20	21	23	17	20	DNQ	DNQ	17	13															20
34	(Italy) Beggi	WRM	Ret	20	Ret	20	24	Ret	17	18	Ret	24			DNQ	22	22	Ret			15	Ret	DNQ	DNQ	DNQ	DNQ							15
35	(France) Meo	Honda	15	17	Ret	Ret	Ret	17	Ret	DNS																							14
36	(Finland) Kovalainen	Honda	20	18	DNQ	DNQ	Ret	Ret	19	16	DNQ	DNQ			Ret	19			Ret	Ret			DNQ	DNQ	Ret	DNS			DNQ	DNQ	Ret	Ret	13
37	(Finland) Remes	Honda	DNQ	DNQ							DNQ	DNQ							Ret	24							14	19	DNQ	DNQ			9
38	(Finland) Pyrhönen	Kawasaki	Ret	Ret	23	22	22	23	18	15	23	Ret																					9
39	(Netherlands) Verhoeven	Suzuki	19	19	DNQ	DNQ	DNQ	DNQ																									9
39	(Netherlands) Verhoeven	Honda													DNQ	DNQ	DNQ	DNQ	21	23	DNQ	DNQ	24	21	24	25	22	16	DNQ	DNQ			9
40	(Japan) Masuda	Honda											13	23																			8
41	(Japan) Toda	Suzuki											20	15																			7
42	(United Kingdom) Jones	Kawasaki																									Ret	20	23	25	19	18	6
43	(Italy) Stevanini	Yamaha							20	21	DNQ	DNQ			Ret	17	Ret	24			22	Ret											5
44	(France) Leonce	Yamaha																	Ret	19	26	24	18	23	DNQ	DNQ			DNQ	DNQ			5
45	(Japan) Ohkawara	Yamaha											19	18																			5
46	(Japan) Narita	Yamaha											Ret	17																			4
47	(South Africa) Bradshaw	Honda													22	18					Ret	Ret							21	21			3
48	(Czech Republic) Kadlecek	Honda																					20	19									3
49	(Norway) Gundersen	Yamaha																									19	Ret					2
50	(Germany) Schröter	Suzuki									DNQ	DNQ																			DNQ	19	2
51	(Portugal) Gonçalves	Honda					20	20																									2
52	(United States) Graham	Kawasaki													DNQ	DNQ	21	20	DNQ	DNQ	28	22	DNQ	DNQ									1
53	(Belgium) Salaets	Suzuki																							20	21							1
54	(United Kingdom) Smith	Honda																							23	23			20	22	DNQ	DNQ	1
	(Czech Republic) Cepelak	KTM																					DNQ	DNQ	21	22							0
	(Japan) Kaga	Suzuki											24	21																			0
	(Japan) Ogata	Honda											21	26																			0
	(Netherlands) Roos	Yamaha	DNQ	DNQ																											21	Ret	0
	(Sweden) Karlsson	Suzuki																	Ret	21													0
	(Denmark) K. Jensen	Yamaha			DNQ	DNQ	DNQ	DNQ	DNQ	DNQ					DNQ	DNQ	DNQ	DNQ	25	22	DNQ	DNQ	DNQ	DNQ	22	Ret							0
	(Japan) Takahama	Honda											23	22																			0
	(Italy) Bricca	KTM	25	22	DNQ	DNQ	DNQ	Ret	DNQ	DNQ																							0
	(Japan) Kitai	Suzuki											22	25																			0
	(Czech Republic) Michek	Kawasaki	DNQ	DNQ																													0
	(Czech Republic) Michek	Honda																					Ret	22									0
	(Slovenia) Moze	Suzuki																					23	Ret									0
	(Netherlands) Saris	Yamaha																													23	Ret	0
	(Japan) Kojima	Suzuki																							DNQ	DNQ	DNQ	DNQ	26	24	DNQ	DNQ	0
	(Sweden) J. Lindhe	KTM	Ret	Ret															DNQ	DNQ	DNQ	Ret	DNQ	DNQ	DNQ	24							0
	(Japan) Kugimura	Yamaha											Ret	24																			0
	(Spain) Barreda	Suzuki			25	Ret									DNQ	DNQ																	0
	(Japan) Hiratsuka	Kawasaki											25	Ret																			0
	(Japan) Numata	Honda											DNQ	27																			0
	(France) Potisek	Honda																													Ret	Ret	0
	(Sweden) Norlen	Suzuki	DNQ	DNQ	DNQ	DNQ	DNQ	DNQ	DNQ	DNQ	DNQ	DNQ																					0
	(Italy) Dottori	Kawasaki	DNQ	DNQ	DNQ	DNQ	DNQ	DNQ	DNQ	DNQ											DNQ	DNQ											0
	(Russia) Parshin	Suzuki	DNQ	DNQ	DNQ	DNQ	DNQ	DNQ																							DNQ	DNQ	0
	(Republic of Ireland) McKeown	KTM																									DNQ	DNQ	DNQ	DNQ	DNQ	DNQ	0
	(Austria) Reisinger	Suzuki									DNQ	DNQ											DNQ	DNQ									0
	(Netherlands) Advokaat	Honda	DNQ	DNQ																													0
	(Portugal) Santos	Yamaha					DNQ	DNQ																									0
	(Portugal) Venda	Kawasaki					DNQ	DNQ																									0
	(Italy) Dami	Suzuki							DNQ	DNQ																							0
	(Canada) Cooke	Honda							DNQ	DNQ																							0
	(Germany) Huber	KTM									DNQ	DNQ																					0
	(Japan) Ogawa	Kawasaki											DNQ	DNQ																			0
	(Japan) Idehara	Yamaha											DNQ	DNQ																			0
	(France) Beaudouin	Suzuki													DNQ	DNQ																	0
	(Bulgaria) Kumanov	Kawasaki															DNQ	DNQ															0
	(Bulgaria) Tonchev	KTM															DNQ	DNQ															0
	(Bulgaria) Avramov	Yamaha															DNQ	DNQ															0
	(Sweden) M. Lindhe	Yamaha																	DNQ	DNQ													0
	(Sweden) Algotson	Kawasaki																	DNQ	DNQ													0
	(Denmark) B. Jensen	Suzuki																	DNQ	DNQ													0
	(Sweden) Andersson	Kawasaki																	DNQ	DNQ													0
	(Italy) Cassuci	KTM																			DNQ	DNQ											0
	(Italy) Ricci	Honda																			DNQ	DNQ											0
	(Belgium) Van Nooten	Suzuki																							DNQ	DNQ							0
	(United Kingdom) Garrett	KTM																									DNQ	DNQ					0
	(France) Demeester	Yamaha																													DNQ	DNQ	0
	(Netherlands) van den Berg	KTM																													DNQ	DNQ	0
Pos	Rider	Bike	BEN (Benelux)		ESP (Spain)		POR (Portugal)		ITA (Italy)		GER (Germany)		JPN (Japan)		FRA (France)		BUL (Bulgaria)		SWE (Sweden)		ITA (Italy)		CZE (Czech Republic)		BEL (Belgium)		NIR (Northern Ireland)		GBR (United Kingdom)		NED (Netherlands)		Points

== MX2 ==
=== Calendar and Results ===
Round	Date	Grand Prix	Location	Race 1 Winner	Race 2 Winner	Round Winner
MX2
1	April 1	Netherlands	Valkenswaard	(Italy) Tony Cairoli	(Italy) Tony Cairoli	(Italy) Tony Cairoli
2	April 15	Spain	Bellpuig	(France) Christophe Pourcel	(Italy) Tony Cairoli	(Italy) Tony Cairoli
3	April 22	Portugal	Águeda	(Italy) Tony Cairoli	(Italy) Tony Cairoli	(Italy) Tony Cairoli
4	May 6	Italy	Mantova	(Italy) Tony Cairoli	(Italy) Tony Cairoli	(Italy) Tony Cairoli
5	May 13	Germany	Teutschenthal	(Italy) Tony Cairoli	(Italy) Tony Cairoli	(Italy) Tony Cairoli
6	May 27	Japan	Sugo	(France) Christophe Pourcel	(Italy) Tony Cairoli	(France) Christophe Pourcel
7	June 10	France	St Jean d'Angély	(Italy) Tony Cairoli	(Italy) Tony Cairoli	(Italy) Tony Cairoli
8	June 17	Bulgaria	Sevlievo	(Italy) Tony Cairoli	(Italy) Tony Cairoli	(Italy) Tony Cairoli
9	July 1	Sweden	Uddevalla	(United Kingdom) Tommy Searle	(Italy) Tony Cairoli	(Italy) Tony Cairoli
10	July 15	Italy	Faenza	(Italy) Tony Cairoli	(France) Christophe Pourcel	(Italy) Tony Cairoli
11	July 29	Czech Republic	Loket	(Italy) Tony Cairoli	(France) Nicolas Aubin	(France) Nicolas Aubin
12	August 5	Belgium	Namur	(United Kingdom) Tommy Searle	(France) Christophe Pourcel	(Italy) Davide Guarneri
13	August 19	Northern Ireland	Moneyglass	(Italy) Tony Cairoli	(Italy) Tony Cairoli	(Italy) Tony Cairoli
14	August 26	United Kingdom	Donington Park	(France) Nicolas Aubin	(United Kingdom) Tommy Searle	(United Kingdom) Tommy Searle
15	September 2	Netherlands	Lierop	(Italy) Tony Cairoli	(Italy) Tony Cairoli	(Italy) Tony Cairoli

=== Entry list ===
Full-Time Teams & Riders
Team	Constructor	No	Rider	Rounds
Molson Kawasaki Racing	Kawasaki	4	(United Kingdom) Stephen Sword	9–11
Molson Kawasaki Racing	Kawasaki	14	(South Africa) Gareth Swanepoel	1–15
Molson Kawasaki Racing	Kawasaki	24	(United Kingdom) Tom Church	1–15
Molson Kawasaki Racing	Kawasaki	111	(United Kingdom) Ray Rowson	4, 7, 12, 14
Martin Honda	Honda	7	(United States) Ryan Mills	1–3
Martin Honda	Honda	59	(France) Gautier Paulin	4–5, 10–13
Martin Honda	Honda	141	(Italy) Andrea Cervellin	10
Bike-It Dixon Yamaha UK	Yamaha	8	(United Kingdom) Carl Nunn	2–10, 12–15
Bike-It Dixon Yamaha UK	Yamaha	15	(Spain) Carlos Campano	2–5, 7–15
Bike-It Dixon Yamaha UK	Yamaha	50	(United Kingdom) Martin Barr	1–15
AXO Silver Action KTM	KTM	10	(Portugal) Rui Gonçalves	2–5, 7–15
AXO Silver Action KTM	KTM	44	(Italy) Angelo Pellegrini	1
AXO Silver Action KTM	KTM	57	(Italy) Michele De Bortoli	4
Van Beers Racing	Yamaha	11	(Belgium) Dennis Verbruggen	1–12, 14–15
Ricci Racing	Yamaha	12	(Norway) Kenneth Gundersen	1–12, 14–15
Ricci Racing	Yamaha	39	(Italy) Davide Guarneri	2, 4–15
Ricci Racing	Yamaha	131	(France) Nicolas Aubin	1–15
3C Racing	Yamaha	13	(Italy) Manuel Monni	1–6, 11–15
Red Bull KTM	KTM	16	(South Africa) Tyla Rattray	1–11
Red Bull KTM	KTM	101	(United Kingdom) Tommy Searle	1–15
SRS Racing	Honda	17	(Finland) Matti Seistola	1–15
SRS Racing	Honda	18	(Italy) Pier Filippo Bertuzzo	1–4, 7–8, 10–12
Team GPKR	Kawasaki	20	(France) Gregory Aranda	1–5, 7–8, 10–12
Team GPKR	Kawasaki	377	(France) Christophe Pourcel	1–13
Team CLS	Kawasaki	21	(France) Steven Frossard	1–5, 11–15
Team CLS	Kawasaki	22	(France) Anthony Boissiere	1–15
Team CLS	Kawasaki	51	(France) Romain Bertin	7, 12
JM Racing	KTM	23	(Belgium) Joel Roelants	11–14
JM Racing	KTM	145	(Denmark) Nikolaj Larsen	11
Sarholz KTM	KTM	25	(South Africa) Wyatt Avis	1–5, 7–10, 15
Sarholz KTM	KTM	27	(Germany) Marcus Schiffer	1–15
Sarholz KTM	KTM	60	(Germany) Stephan Mock	5
Team KTM Errevi	KTM	28	(Italy) Roberto Lombrici	1–5, 7, 10–11, 14–15
Team KTM Errevi	KTM	29	(Austria) Matthias Walkner	1–4, 7, 10–12, 15
LS Motorsport	Honda	30	(Belgium) Dennis Dierckx	1–5, 7, 9, 12
Sturm Racing Team	Kawasaki	32	(Germany) Robert Sturm	1–5, 7, 12–15
Team Wulfsport Kawasaki	Kawasaki	34	(United Kingdom) Shaun Simpson	1–10, 13–15
Team Yamaha De Carli	Yamaha	36	(Italy) Matteo Bonini	1–5, 7–8, 10–15
Team Yamaha De Carli	Yamaha	222	(Italy) Tony Cairoli	1–13, 15
Team Yamaha De Carli	Yamaha	501	(Italy) Alessandro Lupino	1–4, 9–11
Favor KTM Motorsport	KTM	37	(Estonia) Gert Krestinov	1–5, 14–15
Fork Rent Suzuki	Suzuki	45	(United Kingdom) Jake Nicholls	1–12
Fork Rent Suzuki	Suzuki	46	(United Kingdom) Jason Dougan	1–15
Team NGS	Honda	47	(France) Pascal Leuret	1–11
Team NGS	Honda	67	(France) Maxim Lesage	5
Brouwer Vangani Racing	KTM	66	(Latvia) Aigars Bobkovs	1–4, 9–15
Brouwer Vangani Racing	KTM	77	(South Africa) Shannon Terreblanche	1–5, 7–9
Buersfoon Suzuki MX Team	Suzuki	70	(Netherlands) Nick Tuin	1–5
Buersfoon Suzuki MX Team	Suzuki	80	(Netherlands) Erik Eggens	1–4, 7, 9, 12, 15
Buersfoon Suzuki MX Team	Suzuki	98	(Netherlands) Mike Kras	9–12, 15
Suzuki Swift Motocross Team	Suzuki	74	(United Kingdom) Elliott Banks-Browne	1–9, 11–15
Suzuki Swift Motocross Team	Suzuki	99	(United States) Sean Hamblin	1–9, 12–15
JK Racing	Yamaha	81	(France) Jeremy Tarroux	1–5, 7–15
Champ KTM	KTM	86	(Netherlands) Rob van Vijfeijken	1–5, 7–12, 14–15
Champ KTM	KTM	89	(Belgium) Jeremy van Horebeek	1–5, 7–15
MX Team PSM	Yamaha	95	(France) Hugo Dagod	1–3
MX Team PSM	Yamaha	121	(France) Xavier Boog	1–5, 7–15
Eurotank Racing Team	Honda	116	(Slovakia) Martin Kohut	2–5, 7–8
Eurotank Racing Team	Honda	216	(Finland) Eero Remes	11–12
Wild Card Teams & Riders
Team	Constructor	No	Rider	Rounds
Team Taxi Marcel	Suzuki	41	(Belgium) Tom de Belder	1–4, 7
TEKA Suzuki	Suzuki	42	(Belarus) Evgeni Tyletski	8, 15
Van der Haar Racing	KTM	43	(Netherlands) George Strik	1, 15
Van der Haar Racing	KTM	48	(Netherlands) Rinus van de Ven	1–3, 5, 15
	KTM	49	(Norway) Kjetil Gundersen	1
Team Zambrana	Yamaha	52	(Spain) Xavier Hernandez	2–3
	Yamaha	53	(Spain) Carmelo Gutierrez	2
Hard Racing Team	KTM	54	(Portugal) Paulo Alberto	3
Suzuki Cepsa Motogomes	Suzuki	55	(Portugal) Sandro Silva	3
RBS Racing	Honda	56	(Italy) Deny Philippaerts	4–5, 10
	KTM	58	(Greece) George Iliopoulos	4
DMSB Junior Team	KTM	62	(Germany) Dennis Baudrexl	5
Elf Team Pfeil Kawasaki	Kawasaki	63	(France) Florent Richier	5
Elf Team Pfeil Kawasaki	Kawasaki	65	(Czech Republic) Filip Neugebauer	5
Team KTM France	KTM	64	(France) Khounsith Vongsana	13
AGS MX Team	Honda	68	(Austria) Günter Schmidinger	5, 11
AGS MX Team	Honda	78	(Austria) Andreas Schmidinger	5, 11
Sweden Motocross Team	KTM	69	(Sweden) Jonas Wing	15
PAR Honda	Honda	75	(United Kingdom) Ashley Greedy	12, 14–15
Nimag AAD Suzuki	Suzuki	77	(South Africa) Shannon Terreblanche	10–15
	KTM	79	(Germany) Sascha Glass	5
Team YZ	Yamaha	82	(Japan) Tadashi Kugimura	6
Team YZ	Yamaha	88	(Japan) Takuma Kojima	6
Team YZ	Yamaha	91	(Japan) Manabu Watanabe	6
Club Yamaha	Yamaha	83	(Japan) Shintarou Uchiyama	6
Club Yamaha	Yamaha	103	(Japan) Tatsuya Saiki	6
Club Yamaha	Yamaha	107	(Japan) Masanori Ito	6
DMU Motocross Team	Yamaha	84	(Denmark) Kenneth Nielsen	1
Seki Racing MotoRoman	Honda	87	(Japan) Kenjirou Tsuji	6
Seki Racing MotoRoman	Honda	105	(Japan) Yuui Hoshino	6
Seki Racing MotoRoman	Honda	108	(Japan) Kouichi Fukaya	6
Jubilo RT	Yamaha	90	(Japan) Yuya Ozaki	6
Moto Tech RT	Yamaha	92	(Japan) Kazuya Tani	6
Team Suzuki Japan	Suzuki	93	(Japan) Yohei Kojima	6
Team SRM	Suzuki	94	(Japan) Yutaka Hoshino	6
Team SRM	Suzuki	96	(Japan) Yuta Ikegaya	6
SRF Team Blue Eagles	Suzuki	97	(Japan) Yoshiyuki Taneki	6
Team HRC	Honda	104	(Japan) Yu Hirata	6
Team Hammer Honda	Honda	109	(Japan) Toshihiro Nakahori	6
	KTM	112	(France) Loic Larrieu	7
	Kawasaki	114	(France) Valentin Teillet	7
Pioneer Yamaha	Yamaha	115	(United Kingdom) Luke Remmer	14
Saku Motoklubi	Kawasaki	117	(Estonia) Edik Kuusk	9
	Suzuki	118	(Bulgaria) Nikolay Kolev	8
	Yamaha	119	(Bulgaria) Gancho Georgiev	8
Papanikolakis Racing Team	Kawasaki	122	(Greece) Alexandros Papanikolakis	8
	KTM	124	(Bulgaria) Peter Siromahov	8
	KTM	125	(Bulgaria) Peter Penev	8
Top Cross TCS	Yamaha	126	(Romania) Elias Raduta	8
	Honda	127	(Sweden) Andreas Hultman	9
	Yamaha	128	(Sweden) Tom Söderström	9, 15
	KTM	129	(Estonia) Taavi Nassar	9
Team Yellow Magic Suzuki	Suzuki	130	(Sweden) Filip Thuresson	9
Team Green Kawasaki	Kawasaki	132	(Sweden) Rickard Sandberg	9
Star Motor MX Team	Honda	133	(Norway) Fredrik Aulisether	9
Star Motor MX Team	Honda	171	(Norway) Remi Nyegaard	15
	Yamaha	134	(Sweden) Fredrik Karlsson	9
TMX Racing Team	Honda	135	(Norway) Mikkel Mikkelsen	9–10
	Honda	137	(Sweden) Niclas Olsson	9
	KTM	138	(Sweden) Johan Dahlgren	9
	KTM	139	(Sweden) Toni Dahl	9, 14
Emos Kawasaki Racing Team	Kawasaki	142	(Czech Republic) Marek Sukup	11
Orion Litomyšl	Suzuki	143	(Czech Republic) Frantisek Smola	11
Orion Litomyšl	Suzuki	149	(Czech Republic) Jiri Bittner	11
Gariboldi Yamaha	Yamaha	144	(Italy) Giuseppe Di Palma	10
SMS Nepomuk Yamaha	Yamaha	148	(Czech Republic) Thomas Paul	11
	Kawasaki	152	(Belgium) Jurgen Wybo	12
Maddii Racing Team	KTM	153	(Italy) Marco Maddii	8, 10
	Honda	156	(Republic of Ireland) Tommy Merton	13
	KTM	157	(United Kingdom) Jason Garrett	13
	Honda	158	(Latvia) Matiss Karro	13–15
	Suzuki	161	(United Kingdom) Luke Wilde	13
Relentless Suzuki	Suzuki	162	(United Kingdom) Jamie Law	14
Relentless Suzuki	Suzuki	163	(United Kingdom) Alex Snow	14
Relentless Suzuki	Suzuki	164	(United Kingdom) Lewis Gregory	14–15
	Honda	165	(Thailand) Arnon Theplib	14
24 Race Suzuki	Suzuki	166	(United Kingdom) Luke Mellows	14
Team Voorwinden/Brouwer KTM	KTM	167	(Netherlands) Pascal Brons	15
Champ KTM Team	KTM	168	(Netherlands) Stuwey Reynders	15
	KTM	169	(Russia) Evgeny Mikhaylov	15
Van de Laar Yamaha Team	Yamaha	170	(Belgium) Jan Lauryssen	15
MtM Grand Prix Team	Suzuki	176	(Sweden) Marcus Norlen	9–15
Bud Racing Kawasaki	Kawasaki	519	(France) Loic Rombaut	10
Bud Racing Kawasaki	Kawasaki	595	(France) Marvin Musquin	10–11

=== Riders Championship ===
Pos	Rider	Bike	BEN (Benelux)		ESP (Spain)		POR (Portugal)		ITA (Italy)		GER (Germany)		JPN (Japan)		FRA (France)		BUL (Bulgaria)		SWE (Sweden)		ITA (Italy)		CZE (Czech Republic)		BEL (Belgium)		NIR (Northern Ireland)		GBR (United Kingdom)		NED (Netherlands)		Points
1	(Italy) Cairoli	Yamaha	1	1	2	1	1	1	1	1	1	1	3	1	1	1	1	1	2	1	1	2	1	2	16	2	1	1			1	1	660
2	(United Kingdom) Searle	KTM	10	Ret	6	4	3	6	3	4	15	7	4	3	5	6	2	5	1	5	11	5	3	3	1	10	2	2	2	1	4	7	510
3	(France) Pourcel	Kawasaki	7	3	1	2	2	Ret	4	5	2	2	1	2	2	2	6	2	15	2	2	1	4	12	Ret	1	DNS	DNS					436
4	(South Africa) Rattray	KTM	2	2	4	3	5	Ret	2	2	4	3	2	5	3	3	3	3	Ret	3	3	3	8	Ret									371
5	(South Africa) Swanepoel	Kawasaki	3	6	18	18	4	8	6	3	Ret	15	5	4	9	7	8	6	16	4	10	11	6	16	15	6	Ret	6	4	16	2	4	364
6	(France) Aubin	Yamaha	6	8	Ret	5	18	2	11	6	9	6	13	16	6	5	10	9	20	13	4	Ret	2	1	11	Ret	5	Ret	1	5	8	5	358
7	(France) Leuret	Honda	9	11	5	6	7	3	7	12	6	4	6	6	4	4	4	4	4	14	5	4	5	Ret									320
8	(Finland) Seistola	Honda	12	13	10	10	9	11	18	7	8	8	10	22	15	17	14	16	11	8	13	7	18	6	6	5	Ret	19	6	9	5	Ret	276
9	(Germany) Schiffer	KTM	8	7	8	13	21	Ret	10	10	7	20	Ret	17	Ret	Ret	18	15	7	6	8	10	13	10	3	8	8	4	DNS	DNS	6	11	260
10	(Norway) Ke. Gundersen	Yamaha	4	5	12	14	12	5	5	Ret	3	14	12	9	16	16	16	7	3	Ret	Ret	12	DNS	DNS	5	Ret			16	15	3	Ret	244
11	(Portugal) Gonçalves	KTM			19	20	26	18	15	8	Ret	17			12	12	11	10	8	23	7	8	Ret	7	2	9	3	3	14	10	12	3	243
12	(Italy) Guarneri	Yamaha			Ret	DNS			Ret	13	5	5	Ret	11	8	14	5	12	6	10	Ret	6	Ret	4	4	3	6	10	DNQ	DNQ	13	Ret	226
13	(France) Boog	Yamaha	13	Ret	16	9	14	12	16	Ret	23	23			14	11	15	11	10	12	15	9	7	17	7	7	10	Ret	5	Ret	7	6	219
14	(United Kingdom) Nunn	Yamaha			14	16	13	14	17	21	10	10	18	8	13	9	12	8	13	9	14	16			DNQ	18	7	16	19	7	15	10	198
15	(France) Boissiere	Kawasaki	11	9	23	17	8	4	Ret	Ret	Ret	11	7	7	18	8	7	17	9	16	12	15	17	15	17	19	DNS	DNS	Ret	Ret	18	9	192
16	(Belgium) van Horebeek	KTM	16	17	9	22	25	19	22	Ret	11	13			Ret	21	19	13	5	18	22	23	25	Ret	8	4	9	7	20	6	10	8	167
17	(France) Tarroux	KTM	15	18	26	Ret	16	16	23	20	26	Ret			17	15	13	19	Ret	Ret	16	14	9	8	13	14	12	5	3	2	27	20	160
18	(Italy) Bonini	Yamaha	DNQ	DNQ	21	7	6	10	Ret	19	22	26			11	13	DNQ	DNQ			21	Ret	12	11	10	11	15	13	7	3	Ret	12	157
19	(Italy) Monni	Yamaha	Ret	14	7	8	10	Ret	Ret	Ret	20	12	DNS	DNS									11	13	9	13	11	12	9	11	17	15	144
20	(United Kingdom) Church	Kawasaki	18	Ret	11	15	15	13	9	Ret	16	18	9	Ret	10	10	17	18	Ret	Ret	18	DNS	DNQ	DNQ	Ret	15	Ret	9	15	14	16	14	140
21	(United States) Hamblin	Suzuki	Ret	12	DNQ	DNQ	20	Ret	8	9	17	19	8	27	19	20	9	14	DNQ	DNQ					14	16	18	8	12	8	14	Ret	133
22	(Belgium) Verbruggen	Yamaha	14	10	17	21	22	20	13	16	14	16	14	13	Ret	Ret	20	21	17	Ret	Ret	19	16	18	Ret	DNS			11	4	21	Ret	105
23	(United Kingdom) Dougan	Suzuki	DNQ	DNQ	15	19	Ret	Ret	24	22	18	21	11	15	7	Ret	DNQ	DNQ	14	11	9	17	23	14	Ret	20	17	Ret	24	13	DNQ	DNQ	94
24	(United Kingdom) Simpson	Kawasaki	23	22	Ret	12	Ret	7	20	11	13	25	17	14	Ret	Ret	Ret	Ret	Ret	7	Ret	DNS					Ret	26	17	17	20	17	80
25	(Netherlands) Eggens	Suzuki	5	4	3	Ret	Ret	Ret	Ret	DNS					DNQ	DNQ			DNQ	DNQ					Ret	DNS					Ret	2	76
26	(France) Frossard	Kawasaki	20	15	13	11	11	9	14	17	Ret	Ret											Ret	Ret	Ret	Ret	Ret	27	8	Ret	DNQ	DNQ	71
27	(United Kingdom) Barr	Yamaha	Ret	16	DNQ	27	DNQ	DNQ	12	15	DNQ	DNQ	Ret	12	DNQ	23	21	20	DNQ	DNQ	DNQ	DNQ	14	21	18	25	21	14	10	12	DNQ	DNQ	67
28	(France) Paulin	Honda							21	Ret	12	22									Ret	13	15	9	Ret	12	4	23					62
29	(South Africa) Avis	KTM	17	Ret	DNQ	DNQ	Ret	15	Ret	14	19	9			Ret	DNS	22	Ret	12	15	DNQ	DNQ									9	Ret	58
30	(United Kingdom) Sword	Kawasaki																	DNQ	DNQ	17	Ret	10	5									31
31	(Spain) Campano	Yamaha			DNQ	DNQ	DNQ	DNQ	DNQ	DNQ	DNQ	DNQ			DNQ	DNQ	Ret	Ret	DNQ	DNQ	20	20	19	19	DNQ	DNQ	13	11	18	18	DNQ	DNQ	30
32	(Netherlands) van Vijfeijken	KTM	19	19	24	24	DNQ	DNQ	DNQ	DNQ	DNQ	DNQ			DNQ	DNQ	24	24	DNQ	20	DNQ	DNQ	DNQ	DNQ	21	24			DNQ	DNQ	11	13	23
33	(France) Musquin	Kawasaki																			6	18	20	24									19
34	(Belgium) Roelants	KTM																					DNQ	DNQ	12	Ret	Ret	25	13	19			19
35	(Japan) Y. Kojima	Suzuki											15	10																			17
36	(France) Aranda	Kawasaki	21	20	22	Ret	19	17	19	18	21	Ret			Ret	19	DNQ	DNQ			19	Ret	22	Ret	DNQ	DNQ							16
37	(South Africa) Terreblanche	KTM	DNQ	DNQ	DNQ	DNQ	DNQ	DNQ	DNQ	DNQ	DNQ	DNQ			22	22	26	22	21	17													12
37	(South Africa) Terreblanche	Suzuki																			DNQ	Ret	26	20	DNQ	DNQ	14	21	Ret	Ret	Ret	22	12
38	(United Kingdom) Nicholls	Suzuki	DNQ	DNQ	DNQ	DNQ	23	Ret	DNQ	DNQ	DNQ	DNQ	21	19	20	18	DNQ	DNQ	19	19	24	22	24	22	Ret	21							10
39	(Latvia) Bobkovs	KTM	DNQ	DNQ	DNQ	DNQ	DNQ	DNQ	DNQ	DNQ									22	24	23	Ret	DNQ	DNQ	DNQ	DNQ	16	18	DNQ	21	22	Ret	8
40	(France) Vongsana	KTM																									Ret	15					6
41	(Estonia) Krestinov	KTM	DNQ	DNQ	20	23	DNQ	DNQ	DNQ	DNQ	DNQ	DNQ																	DNQ	DNQ	26	15	6
42	(Japan) Hirata	Honda											16	20																			6
43	(Sweden) Norlen	Suzuki																	DNQ	DNQ	25	Ret	DNQ	DNQ	DNQ	DNQ	19	17	DNQ	DNQ	DNQ	DNQ	6
44	(Austria) Walkner	KTM	DNQ	DNQ	DNQ	DNQ	DNQ	DNQ	DNQ	DNQ					Ret	Ret					DNQ	DNQ	DNQ	DNQ	19	17					DNQ	DNQ	6
45	(Netherlands) van de Ven	KTM	24	21	DNQ	DNQ	DNQ	DNQ			DNQ	DNQ																			19	18	5
46	(Spain) Hernandez	Yamaha			DNQ	DNQ	17	Ret																									4
47	(Japan) Kugimura	Yamaha											24	18																			3
48	(Sweden) Söderström	Yamaha																	18	Ret											DNQ	DNQ	3
49	(Netherlands) Kras	Suzuki																	23	21	DNQ	DNQ	DNQ	DNQ	DNQ	DNQ					24	19	2
50	(Japan) Ozaki	Yamaha											19	21																			2
51	(United Kingdom) Banks-Browne	Suzuki	DNQ	DNQ	DNQ	DNQ	DNQ	DNQ	DNQ	DNQ	DNQ	DNQ	20	Ret	DNQ	DNQ	Ret	23	DNQ	DNQ			DNQ	DNQ	DNQ	DNQ	20	22	Ret	Ret	DNQ	DNQ	2
52	(United Kingdom) Rowson	Kawasaki							DNQ	DNQ					DNQ	DNQ									20	23			21	Ret			1
53	(Latvia) Karro	Honda																									22	20	DNQ	DNQ	23	Ret	1
54	(United Kingdom) Gregory	Suzuki																											Ret	20	DNQ	DNQ	1
	(Netherlands) Reynders	KTM																													25	21	0
	(Finland) Remes	Honda																					21	25	DNQ	DNQ							0
	(France) Larrieu	KTM													21	Ret																	0
	(Italy) Philippaerts	Honda							DNQ	DNQ	DNQ	DNQ									DNQ	21											0
	(Italy) Lombrici	KTM	26	23	DNQ	DNQ	DNQ	DNQ	DNQ	DNQ	DNQ	DNQ			DNQ	DNQ					DNQ	DNQ	DNQ	DNQ					22	Ret	DNQ	DNQ	0
	(Belgium) de Belder	Suzuki	22	Ret	25	25	DNQ	DNQ	DNQ	DNQ					DNQ	DNQ																	0
	(Japan) T. Kojima	Yamaha											22	25																			0
	(Sweden) Karlsson	Yamaha																	Ret	22													0
	(Belgium) Wybo	Kawasaki																							Ret	22							0
	(United Kingdom) Law	Suzuki																											Ret	22			0
	(Japan) Nakahori	Honda											23	24																			0
	(Japan) Yut. Hoshino	Suzuki											25	23																			0
	(Belarus) Tyletski	Suzuki															23	26													DNQ	DNQ	0
	(Italy) Bertuzzo	Honda	DNQ	DNQ	DNQ	DNQ	DNQ	DNQ	DNQ	DNQ					DNQ	DNQ	DNQ	DNQ			DNQ	DNQ	27	23	DNQ	DNQ							0
	(United Kingdom) Snow	Suzuki																											23	Ret			0
	(Belgium) Dierckx	Honda	25	Ret	DNQ	DNQ	DNQ	DNQ	DNQ	DNQ	25	24			Ret	Ret			Ret	DNS					DNQ	DNQ							0
	(Sweden) Sandberg	Kawasaki																	24	25													0
	(Germany) Sturm	Kawasaki	DNQ	DNQ	DNQ	DNQ	DNQ	DNQ	DNQ	DNQ	DNQ	DNQ			DNQ	DNQ									DNQ	DNQ	Ret	24	DNQ	DNQ	DNQ	DNQ	0
	(United States) Mills	Honda	DNQ	DNQ	DNQ	DNQ	24	Ret																									0
	(France) Richier	Kawasaki									24	Ret																					0
	(Italy) Maddii	KTM															25	25			DNQ	DNQ											0
	(Japan) Fukaya	Honda											26	26																			0
	(Italy) Lupino	Yamaha	DNQ	DNQ	Ret	26	DNQ	DNQ	DNQ	DNQ									DNQ	DNQ	DNQ	DNQ	DNQ	DNQ									0
	(Japan) Watanabe	Yamaha											27	28																			0
	(Slovakia) Kohut	Honda			DNQ	DNQ	DNQ	DNQ	DNQ	DNQ	DNQ	DNQ			DNQ	DNQ	Ret	Ret															0
	(Netherlands) Strik	KTM	Ret	Ret																											DNQ	DNQ	0
	(Netherlands) Tuin	Suzuki	DNQ	DNQ	DNQ	DNQ	DNQ	DNQ	DNQ	DNQ	DNQ	DNQ																					0
	(France) Dagod	Yamaha	DNQ	DNQ	DNQ	DNQ	DNQ	DNQ																									0
	(United Kingdom) Greedy	Honda																							DNQ	DNQ			DNQ	DNQ	DNQ	DNQ	0
	(Austria) G. Schmidinger	Honda									DNQ	DNQ											DNQ	DNQ									0
	(Austria) A. Schmidinger	Honda									DNQ	DNQ											DNQ	DNQ									0
	(France) Bertin	Kawasaki													DNQ	DNQ									DNQ	DNQ							0
	(Norway) Mikkelsen	Honda																	DNQ	DNQ	DNQ	DNQ											0
	(Sweden) Dahl	KTM																	DNQ	DNQ									DNQ	DNQ			0
	(Denmark) Nielsen	Yamaha	DNQ	DNQ																													0
	(Italy) Pellegrini	KTM	DNQ	DNQ																													0
	(Norway) Kj. Gundersen	KTM	DNQ	DNQ																													0
	(Spain) Gutierrez	Yamaha			DNQ	DNQ																											0
	(Portugal) Silva	Suzuki					DNQ	DNQ																									0
	(Portugal) Alberto	KTM					DNQ	DNQ																									0
	(Italy) De Bortoli	KTM							DNQ	DNQ																							0
	(Greece) Iliopoulos	KTM							DNQ	DNQ																							0
	(France) Lesage	Honda									DNQ	DNQ																					0
	(Czech Republic) Neugebauer	Kawasaki									DNQ	DNQ																					0
	(Germany) Mock	KTM									DNQ	DNQ																					0
	(Germany) Glass	KTM									DNQ	DNQ																					0
	(Germany) Baudrexl	KTM									DNQ	DNQ																					0
	(Japan) Ito	Yamaha											DNQ	DNQ																			0
	(Japan) Ikegaya	Suzuki											DNQ	DNQ																			0
	(Japan) Yuu. Hoshino	Honda											DNQ	DNQ																			0
	(Japan) Saiki	Yamaha											DNQ	DNQ																			0
	(Japan) Tsuji	Honda											DNQ	DNQ																			0
	(Japan) Tani	Yamaha											DNQ	DNQ																			0
	(Japan) Uchiyama	Yamaha											DNQ	DNQ																			0
	(Japan) Taneki	Suzuki											DNQ	DNQ																			0
	(France) Teillet	Kawasaki													DNQ	DNQ																	0
	(Greece) Papanikolakis	Kawasaki															DNQ	DNQ															0
	(Bulgaria) Kolev	Suzuki															DNQ	DNQ															0
	(Romania) Raduta	Yamaha															DNQ	DNQ															0
	(Bulgaria) Penev	KTM															DNQ	DNQ															0
	(Bulgaria) Georgiev	Yamaha															DNQ	DNQ															0
	(Bulgaria) Siromahov	KTM															DNQ	DNQ															0
	(Estonia) Kuusk	Kawasaki																	DNQ	DNQ													0
	(Norway) Aulisether	Honda																	DNQ	DNQ													0
	(Sweden) Thuresson	Suzuki																	DNQ	DNQ													0
	(Estonia) Nassar	KTM																	DNQ	DNQ													0
	(Sweden) Hultman	Honda																	DNQ	DNQ													0
	(Sweden) Dahlgren	KTM																	DNQ	DNQ													0
	(Sweden) Olsson	Honda																	DNQ	DNQ													0
	(Italy) Cervellin	Honda																			DNQ	DNQ											0
	(France) Rombaut	Kawasaki																			DNQ	DNQ											0
	(Italy) Di Palma	Yamaha																			DNQ	DNQ											0
	(Czech Republic) Sukup	Kawasaki																					DNQ	DNQ									0
	(Denmark) Larsen	KTM																					DNQ	DNQ									0
	(Czech Republic) Smola	Suzuki																					DNQ	DNQ									0
	(Czech Republic) Paul	Yamaha																					DNQ	DNQ									0
	(Czech Republic) Bittner	Suzuki																					DNQ	DNQ									0
	(Republic of Ireland) Merton	Honda																									DNQ	DNQ					0
	(United Kingdom) Wilde	Suzuki																									DNQ	DNQ					0
	(United Kingdom) Garrett	KTM																									DNQ	DNQ					0
	(United Kingdom) Remmer	Yamaha																											DNQ	DNQ			0
	(United Kingdom) Mellows	Suzuki																											DNQ	DNQ			0
	(Thailand) Theplib	Honda																											DNQ	DNQ			0
	(Belgium) Lauryssen	Yamaha																													DNQ	DNQ	0
	(Sweden) Wing	KTM																													DNQ	DNQ	0
	(Netherlands) Brons	KTM																													DNQ	DNQ	0
	(Norway) Nyegaard	Honda																													DNQ	DNQ	0
	(Russia) Mikhaylov	KTM																													DNQ	DNQ	0
Pos	Rider	Bike	BEN (Benelux)		ESP (Spain)		POR (Portugal)		ITA (Italy)		GER (Germany)		JPN (Japan)		FRA (France)		BUL (Bulgaria)		SWE (Sweden)		ITA (Italy)		CZE (Czech Republic)		BEL (Belgium)		NIR (Northern Ireland)		GBR (United Kingdom)		NED (Netherlands)		Points

== MX3 ==
=== Calendar and Results ===
Round	Date	Grand Prix	Location	Race 1 Winner	Race 2 Winner	Round Winner
MX3
1	April 1	France	Castelnau-de-Lévis	(France) Mickaël Pichon	(France) Mickaël Pichon	(France) Mickaël Pichon
2	April 15	Italy	Cingoli	(France) Benjamin Coisy	(France) Benjamin Coisy	(France) Benjamin Coisy
3	April 22	Spain	Talavera de la Reina	(Belgium) Sven Breugelmans	(Belgium) Sven Breugelmans	(Belgium) Sven Breugelmans
4	May 20	Sweden	Tomelilla	(France) Benjamin Coisy	(France) Yves Demaria	(Belgium) Sven Breugelmans
5	May 27	France	Brou	(France) Pierre Renet	(France) Yves Demaria	(France) Yves Demaria
6	June 10	Spain	Alhama de Murcia	(Spain) Alvaro Lozano	(France) Benjamin Coisy	(France) Yves Demaria
7	July 1	Netherlands	Markelo	(Belgium) Sven Breugelmans	(Belgium) Sven Breugelmans	(Belgium) Sven Breugelmans
8	July 8	Croatia	Mladina	(France) Yves Demaria	(France) Yves Demaria	(France) Yves Demaria
9	July 22	Slovakia	Sverepec	(Czech Republic) Martin Zerava	(Czech Republic) Martin Zerava	(Czech Republic) Martin Zerava
10	July 29	Bulgaria	Samokov	(Czech Republic) Martin Zerava	(France) Yves Demaria	(France) Yves Demaria
11	August 12	Slovenia	Orehova vas	(Belgium) Sven Breugelmans	(Belgium) Sven Breugelmans	(Belgium) Sven Breugelmans
12	August 26	Denmark	Randers	(France) Yves Demaria	(France) Yves Demaria	(France) Yves Demaria
13	September 2	Switzerland	Roggenburg	(France) Yves Demaria	(France) Yves Demaria	(France) Yves Demaria
14	September 9	Italy	Faenza	(Italy) Manuel Monni	(Italy) Manuel Monni	(Italy) Manuel Monni

=== Riders Championship ===
Pos	Rider	Bike	FRA (France)		ITA (Italy)		ESP (Spain)		SWE (Sweden)		FRA (France)		ESP (Spain)		NED (Netherlands)		CRO (Croatia)		SVK (Slovakia)		BUL (Bulgaria)		SLO (Slovenia)		DEN (Denmark)		SUI (Switzerland)		ITA (Italy)		Points
1	(France) Yves Demaria	Yamaha	3	2	4	3	Ret	7	6	1	4	1	2	2	7	6	1	1	3	2	3	1	4	5	1	1	1	1	3	2	563
2	(Belgium) Sven Breugelmans	KTM	4	6	2	2	1	1	3	2	5	2	7	8	1	1	9	8	2	4	2	2	1	1	3	9	4	Ret	4	6	526
3	(Finland) Jussi Vehvilainen	Honda	8	3	8	7	8	2	DNS	DNS					2	3	7	5	8	5	6	4	2	3	2	5	3	8	6	4	375
4	(Belgium) Jonas Salaets	Suzuki	7	8	10	8	6	10			7	4	4	6	4	2	6	15	7	10	7	15	6	10	7	3	2	3	9	9	374
5	(Spain) Alvaro Lozano	KTM	6	4	5	Ret	2	3	Ret	5	15	9	1	4	12	8	2	3	Ret	7	Ret	5	7	6	9	4	5	6	5	Ret	368
6	(Czech Republic) Martin Zerava	Honda			7	9	5	6	4	10	2	22	5	3	21	19	Ret	10	1	1	1	3	5	4	10	Ret	Ret	2	7	13	341
7	(Slovenia) Saso Kragelj	Yamaha	9	9	6	5	9	11			8	5	21	9	8	17	5	4	15	14	4	6	3	2	16	6	6	4	10	7	335
8	(France) Christophe Martin	KTM	5	5	3	4	4	4	2	3	3	Ret	3	5	5	9	3	13	Ret	DNS											260
9	(Denmark) Nicolai Hansen	Yamaha	17	19	17	20	Ret	13	5	9	13	7	9	11	Ret	7	Ret	2	11	13	9	8	8	8	8	7	12	Ret	Ret	14	239
10	(Netherlands) Jan van Hastenberg	Honda	21	23			15	18	15	12	11	10	6	10	9	5	19	19	13	21	11	12	9	7	Ret	11	7	10	13	15	205
11	(France) Benjamin Coisy	Honda	2	Ret	1	1	3	8	1	Ret	6	3	Ret	1																	190
12	(Croatia) Nenad Sipek	Yamaha			12	6	12	9									4	6	10	8	22	16	13	9			17	12	15	10	157
13	(Czech Republic) Jan Zaremba	KTM	10	7											13	Ret	8	Ret	5	3			10	Ret					2	3	135
14	(Italy) Martino Vestri	KTM	18	17	13	10	14	26	14	17	14	11	15	15	17	26	12	12	21	24	12	13	Ret	15	18	15	24	Ret	16	20	133
15	(Italy) Simone Virdis	Honda			23	Ret	Ret	Ret	21	18	16	Ret	10	12	Ret	Ret	10	11	18	11	10	9	12	17	Ret	Ret	15	16	11	11	129
16	(Denmark) Kasper Jensen	Yamaha															13	16	12	12			11	13	13	Ret	8	7	14	25	91
17	(Slovakia) Tomas Simko	Suzuki															11	7	4	6	5	7	Ret	Ret							87
18	(Germany) Dennis Schröter	Suzuki									9	8			11	4									12	12					71
19	(Belgium) Jurgen van Nooten	Suzuki	13	10	15	25	Ret	17	13	14	Ret	16	8	13																	70
20	(Austria) Philip Rüf	KTM	15	16	18	23	17	Ret	16	19	19	Ret	13	16	Ret	Ret			19	19	17	17	Ret	19	21	19	21	Ret	29	24	56
21	(France) Fabien Couderc	Kawasaki	Ret	14	14	17	10	12			10	15																			55
22	(Sweden) Jonny Lindhe	KTM																							6	Ret	10	9	20	8	52
23	(Belgium) Yentel Martens	KTM	27	27	Ret	Ret	19	Ret	11	16	20	14	11	Ret	Ret	Ret	Ret	DNS	20	Ret	18	Ret	16	Ret	14	Ret	Ret	Ret	DNQ	DNQ	51
24	(France) Mickaël Pichon	KTM	1	1							Ret	DNS																			50
25	(Italy) Manuel Monni	Yamaha																											1	1	50
26	(Bulgaria) Nikolay Kumanov	Kawasaki															17	14	16	15	8	10					26	24	25	22	46
27	(Italy) Marco Cassuci	KTM			24	Ret	Ret	15					14	14	23	27	Ret	21			14	11	Ret	16					23	Ret	42
28	(Switzerland) Jonathan Burn	Honda	19	13	Ret	15			17	Ret					25	Ret											13	13	19	Ret	38
29	(Denmark) Bo Vang Jensen	Suzuki																							5	2					38
30	(France) Pierre Renet	Honda									1	13																			33
31	(Croatia) Marko Leljak	KTM															14	9	Ret	17	13	Ret	20	21							32
32	(Latvia) Philips Kemplis	Honda	25	Ret	28	Ret	22	27							14	13	21	22	22	18	15	14									31
33	(Sweden) Magnus Lindfors	Yamaha							8	4																					31
34	(Spain) Adrian Garrido	Honda					7	5																							30
35	(Italy) Andrea Bartolini	Yamaha																											8	5	29
36	(Czech Republic) Frantisek Maca	Suzuki	29	18	Ret	16											20	20	14	16			15	Ret							28
37	(France) Frederic Sandouly	Yamaha																									9	14	Ret	12	28
38	(France) Franck Verhaeghe	Yamaha	DNS	DNS	11	12	13	Ret	Ret	Ret	DNS	DNS																			27
39	(Switzerland) Marc Ristori	Honda																									11	5			26
40	(Finland) Jussi Nikkila	Yamaha							Ret	8															22	8					26
41	(Sweden) Joakim Eliasson	Yamaha							9	7																					26
42	(France) Timotei Potisek	Honda													3	16															25
43	(Germany) Dario Gianni Dapor	Suzuki													15	18							14	Ret	19	Ret	16	20			24
44	(Czech Republic) Jan Brabec	Honda																	9	9											24
45	(Slovenia) Erik Slavec	Honda			22	14											16	Ret					19	14					Ret	19	23
46	(Italy) Simone Ricci	Honda	12	Ret	Ret	11	18	21	Ret	DNS																			Ret	DNS	22
47	(Sweden) Bjorn Andersson	Kawasaki							7	13																					22
48	(Netherlands) Patrick Roos	Yamaha													6	15															21
49	(Netherlands) William Saris	Yamaha													Ret	11									11	Ret					20
50	(Belgium) Emmanuel Hubert	Suzuki	DNS	DNS							12	Ret															20	11			20
51	(Slovenia) Miha Spindler	Honda			16	13											18	17					29	Ret							20
52	(France) Maxime Emery	Kawasaki	11	12																											19
53	(Austria) Mario Hirschmugl	KTM															22	18					18	11					18	Ret	19
54	(Estonia) Juss Laansoo	Honda																							4	Ret					18
55	(United States) Bader Manneh	KTM			9	Ret																							Ret	16	17
56	(Denmark) Jesper Kjær Jorgensen	Honda																							15	10					17
57	(Spain) Javier Garcia Vico	Kawasaki											19	7																	16
58	(Finland) Niko Kalatie	KTM							Ret	6																					15
59	(Belgium) Michael Besonhe	Kawasaki	Ret	Ret							17	17			28	Ret							17	18			Ret	Ret			15
60	(France) Johan Marillier	Kawasaki	16	11							Ret	Ret																			15
61	(Sweden) Robert Carlsson	Yamaha							12	15																					15
62	(France) Raphael Beaudouin	Suzuki									Ret	6																			15
63	(Czech Republic) Petr Bartos	Suzuki																	6	Ret											15
64	(Latvia) Ivo Steinbergs	Honda			21	22	16	16			Ret	18			Ret	Ret															13
65	(Netherlands) Rob van Uden	Honda											12	17																	13
66	(Netherlands) Klaas Hofstede	Honda													16	14															12
67	(Denmark) Simon Wulff Sorensen	Suzuki																							17	13					12
68	(United Kingdom) Neil Flockart	Honda					23	25							19	12															11
69	(Spain) Manuel Rodriguez	Yamaha	24	22			11	20																							11
70	(France) Arnaud Demeester	Yamaha							10	Ret	DNS	DNS																			11
71	(Germany) Andreas Huber	KTM													22	22											14	17			11
72	(Germany) Daniel Siegl	KTM													Ret	10									Ret	DNS					11
73	(Netherlands) Oscar Vromans	Yamaha													10	Ret															11
74	(Sweden) Mattias Svard	KTM							Ret	11															Ret	DNS					10
75	(Spain) Ramon Brucart	Kawasaki	28	25	26	26	20	22			23	20	17	18									22	23			27	23	27	26	9
76	(France) Romain Maurez	Yamaha													18	Ret											Ret	15	24	21	9
77	(France) Mike Luxembourger	Kawasaki									22	12																			9
78	(Slovenia) Rok Bekanovic	Honda																					Ret	12							9
79	(France) Mike Valade	Honda																											12	Ret	9
80	(Bulgaria) Rosen Tonchev	KTM																			16	18									8
81	(Czech Republic) David Cadek	Yamaha	14	21																											7
82	(Croatia) Danijel Bozic	KTM			31	Ret			22	Ret	18	19					24	23	26	25	19	21	21	22					DNQ	DNQ	7
83	(Spain) Albert Batalla	Honda					DNS	DNS					16	19																	7
84	(United Kingdom) Glen Phillips	Yamaha					Ret	14																							7
85	(Netherlands) Michel Visser	Yamaha							19	20					24	23									Ret	17					7
86	(France) Adrien Lopez	KTM	20	15																											7
87	(Italy) Ivo Lasagna	Honda																											17	18	7
88	(Sweden) Johan Danielsson	Honda																							23	14					7
89	(Croatia) Goran Goricki	Yamaha															15	Ret													6
90	(Denmark) Kim Nielsen	Yamaha																							20	16					6
91	(Italy) Filippo Debbi	Honda	Ret	DNS	Ret	Ret											26	Ret					30	28					21	17	4
92	(Spain) Jordi Sole	KTM											18	20																	4
93	(Czech Republic) Petr Stloukal	Yamaha																	17	Ret											4
94	(Switzerland) Harry Naepflin	Kawasaki																									19	19			4
95	(Belgium) Frederic Weigert	Yamaha	Ret	20			Ret	19																							3
96	(Switzerland) Alan Boechat	Honda			20	19																					22	21			3
97	(Sweden) Jonas Bodin	Honda	Ret	DNS	27	18																									3
98	(Germany) Andre Prehn	KTM							18	Ret					29	Ret															3
99	(Sweden) Richard Nilsson	Suzuki																							24	18					3
100	(Belgium) Dimitri Vanhoenacker	Yamaha															23	25									25	18			3
101	(Bulgaria) Boncho Avramov	Yamaha																	23	22	20	19	28	26							3
102	(Switzerland) Johnny Lauper	Yamaha																									18	Ret			3
103	(Italy) Luca Maceratesi	Honda			19	24																									2
104	(Hungary) Karlo Golub	Yamaha																	24	20	Ret	20	26	25			28	22			2
105	(Belgium) Sven Wouters	Suzuki	30	29					Ret	Ret	24	23	20	Ret																	1
106	(Sweden) Michel Walter	Honda							20	21					30	25															1
107	(France) Damien Prevet	Yamaha													Ret	20															1
108	(Netherlands) Jarno Verhorevoort	Suzuki													20	Ret															1
109	(Slovenia) Damjan Smrekar	Honda																					23	20							1
110	(Denmark) Kennet Hvam	KTM																							25	20					1
	(Bulgaria) Todor Totev	Honda																			21	22									0
	(Belgium) Didier Ghaye	Yamaha									21	Ret											24	24							0
	(Belgium) Adri Vandersanden	Honda					21	24																							0
	(Italy) Gianluca Faccioli	Suzuki			32	Ret					25	21					28	27											34	29	0
	(Netherlands) Rick Heitnik	Honda													26	21															0
	(Netherlands) Jan Willem Van Werven	KTM																							26	21					0
	(Netherlands) Maikel Swanenberg	Honda			30	21	Ret	DNS																							0
	(Italy) Stefano Bonacina	Honda																					DNS	DNS					22	23	0
	(Netherlands) Rolf Booi	Kawasaki							23	22																					0
	(France) Julien Grade	Honda	22	24																											0
	(United Kingdom) Peter Redford	Honda																							Ret	22					0
	(Bulgaria) Martin Todorov	Yamaha																			23	23									0
	(Belgium) Tom Janssens	Kawasaki	23	26							DNS	DNS																			0
	(Czech Republic) David Kulhavy	Suzuki																	27	23											0
	(Spain) Jesus Barragan	KTM					Ret	23																							0
	(Germany) Jens Wiedemann	Kawasaki																									23	Ret			0
	(Bulgaria) Bojidar Tomanov	Yamaha																			24	24									0
	(Croatia) Ivica Stefanac	KTM															25	24													0
	(Netherlands) Tom Hemmelder	Kawasaki													27	24															0
	(Italy) Luca Pedica	Honda			25	29																									0
	(Austria) Patrick Kainz	Honda															Ret	Ret					25	Ret							0
	(Slovakia) Tomas Pavlovcik	KTM																	25	Ret											0
	(Croatia) Sasa Matusic	Yamaha															27	26													0
	(France) Julien Mercadier	Honda	26	28																											0
	(Slovakia) Peter Pipich	Suzuki																	28	26											0
	(Italy) Alessandro Ghirelli	Suzuki																											26	Ret	0
	(Italy) Roberto Pievani	KTM			Ret	28																	27	27					33	31	0
	(Italy) Fernando Benedini	Yamaha																											28	27	0
	(Italy) Daniele Mosca	Honda			29	27																									0
	(Germany) Daniel Sedlak	Yamaha																							27	Ret					0
	(Croatia) Danko Braim	Yamaha															29	28					31	29							0
	(Italy) Riccardo Mocini	Suzuki																											DNQ	28	0
	(Italy) Jodi Pompili	Honda																											30	30	0
	(Croatia) Tomas Hrvatin	Honda															30	Ret													0
	(Italy) Ivan Morara	Honda																											31	32	0
	(Italy) Andrea Balboni	Honda																											32	Ret	0
	(Italy) Riccardo Avanzolini	Kawasaki																											35	Ret	0
	(Belgium) Vince Collet	Suzuki	Ret	Ret																											0
	(Sweden) Karl Karlsson	Suzuki							Ret	Ret																					0
	(Denmark) Tonni Andersen	Suzuki																							Ret	Ret					0
	(Denmark) Hasse Lorentzen	Yamaha																							Ret	Ret					0
	(Switzerland) Raphael Maradan	Yamaha			Ret	DNS																									0
	(Netherlands) Mart de Jong	KTM													Ret	DNS															0
	(Netherlands) Bart van den Brink	Suzuki																	Ret	DNS											0
	(Hungary) Laszlo Czuni	Honda																	Ret	DNS											0
	(Sweden) Jonas Algotson	Kawasaki																							Ret	DNS					0
	(Denmark) Morten Justesen	Kawasaki																							Ret	DNS					0
	(United Kingdom) Ed Bradley	Honda	DNS	DNS																											0
	(Switzerland) Joel Schafer	Kawasaki	DNS	DNS																											0
	(Czech Republic) Radomir Harbich	Suzuki									DNS	DNS																			0
	(Spain) Manuel Rivas	Kawasaki											DNS	DNS																	0
	(Netherlands) Boyd Karsmakers	Gas Gas													DNS	DNS															0
	(Slovenia) Jaka Moze	Suzuki																					DNS	DNS							0
Pos	Rider	Bike	FRA (France)		ITA (Italy)		ESP (Spain)		SWE (Sweden)		FRA (France)		ESP (Spain)		NED (Netherlands)		CRO (Croatia)		SVK (Slovakia)		BUL (Bulgaria)		SLO (Slovenia)		DEN (Denmark)		SUI (Switzerland)		ITA (Italy)		Points
