= Josh Coppins =

New Zealand motorcycle racer

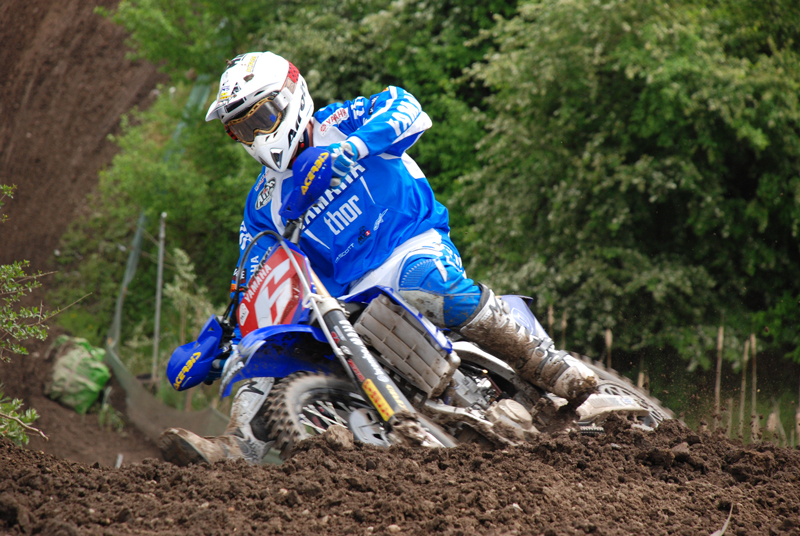
- Coppins in 2007
- Nationality: New Zealander
- Born: 11 March 1977 (age 49) Motueka, New Zealand

Motocross career
- Years active: 1993 - 2012
- Wins: MX1: 11
- GP debut: 1993, GP of Australia, Manjimup, 125cc

Joshua "Josh" Coppins (born 11 March 1977) is a New Zealand former professional motocross rider. He competed in the Motocross World Championships from 1993 to 2012. Coppins posted four top three results during his career including a second place in the 2002 250cc motocross world championship and a second place in the MX1 world championship. He is often regarded as one of the greatest riders that never won a world title.

== Motocross racing career ==
Coppins was born in Motueka, New Zealand. He began his international racing career in 1996 as a privateer. Coppins was runner up to Mickaël Pichon in the 2002 F.I.M. 250cc motocross world championship riding a Honda. In 2005, still on a Honda, he finished second to Stefan Everts in the MX1-GP championship for 450cc four-stroke machines. He has represented New Zealand in the Motocross des Nations since 1997. He also earned a nickname as the “Kiwi Kid”.

During the 2007 FIM Motocross World Championship, Coppins built a 100-point lead in the championship, only to break his shoulder blade in the 12th round forcing him out of the next three rounds and ending his title hopes. Coppins retired from full-time racing in 2012.

== Career results ==
- 2009: 6th MX1 World Championship, winner of 1 GP
- 2008: 5th MX1 World Championship, winner of 1 GP
- 2007: 3rd MX1 World Championship, winner of 5 GP's
- 2006: 7th MX1 World Championship, winner of 1 GP
- 2005: 2nd MX1 World Championship, winner of 2 GP's
- 2005 British Motocross Champion
- 2004: 3rd MX1 World Championship, winner of 1 GP
- 2004 British Motocross Champion
- 2003: 11th MX1 World Championship
- 2002: 2nd 250cc World Championship
- 2001: 6th 250cc World Championship
- 2000: 4th 250cc World Championship
- 1999: 7th 250cc World Championship

| Year | Rnd 1 | Rnd 2 | Rnd 3 | Rnd 4 | Rnd 5 | Rnd 6 | Rnd 7 | Rnd 8 | Rnd 9 | Rnd 10 | Rnd 11 | Rnd 12 | Rnd 13 | Rnd 14 | Rnd 15 | Rnd 16 | Rnd 17 | Average Finish | Podium Percent | Place |
|---|---|---|---|---|---|---|---|---|---|---|---|---|---|---|---|---|---|---|---|---|
| 2004 MX1 | 2 | 9 | 12 | 5 | 5 | 1 | 2 | 4 | 4 | 8 | 3 | 2 | 3 | 3 | 2 | - | - | 4.33 | 53% | 3rd |
| 2005 MX1 | 7 | 4 | 2 | 7 | 2 | 4 | 2 | 7 | 2 | 1 | 1 | 2 | 3 | 3 | 4 | 4 | 3 | 3.41 | 59% | 2nd |
| 2006 MX1 | OUT | OUT | OUT | OUT | OUT | OUT | OUT | 3 | 2 | 3 | 2 | 2 | 1 | 2 | 5 | - | - | 2.50 | 88% | 7th |
| 2007 MX1 | 1 | 1 | 2 | 1 | 3 | 3 | 1 | 1 | 5 | 2 | DNF | OUT | OUT | 18 | OUT | - | - | 3.45 | 82% | 3rd |
