= Sverepec =

- Municipality
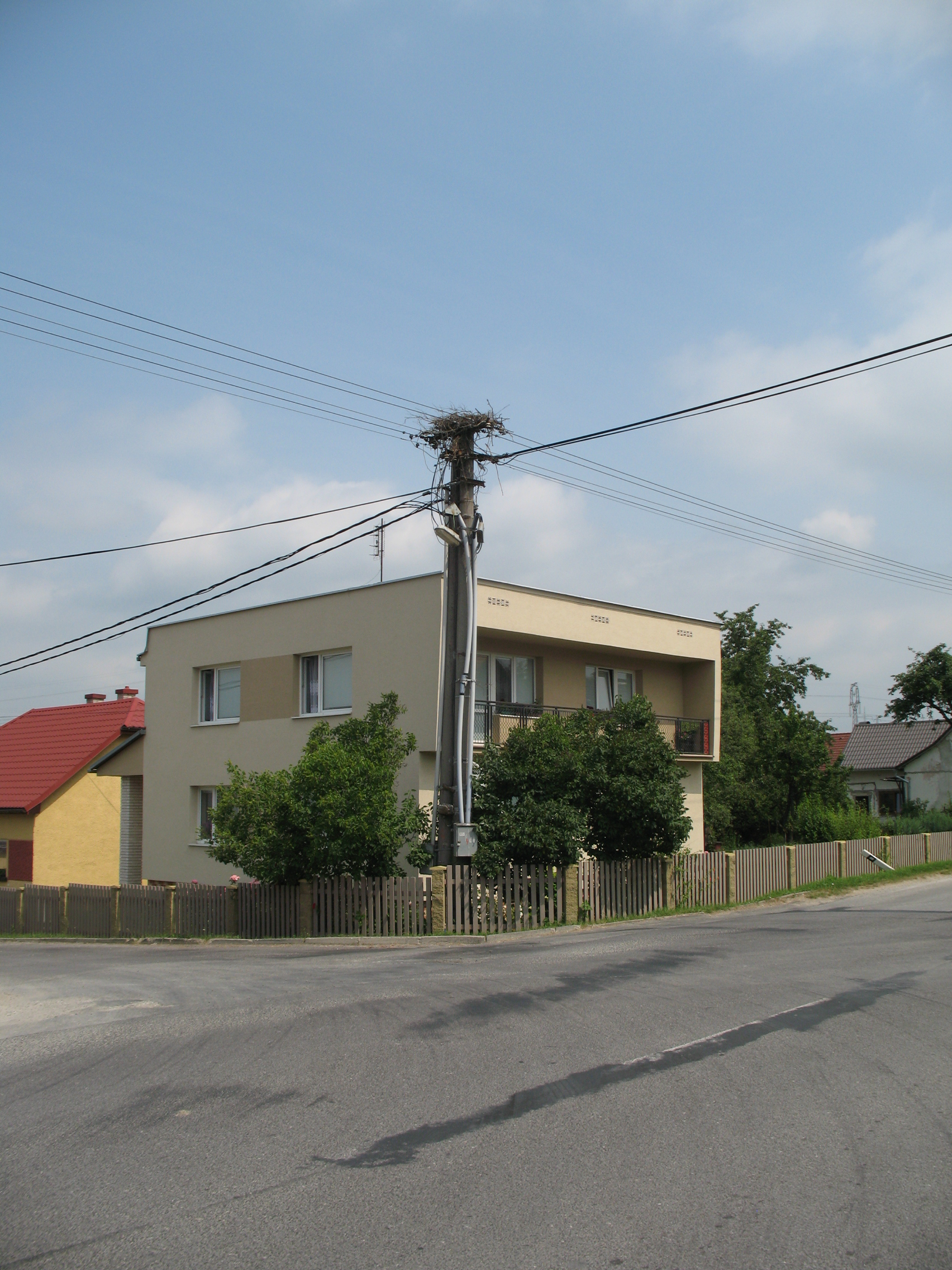

- Flag

- Location of Sverepec in the Trenčín Region Location of Sverepec in Slovakia
- Coordinates: 49.08°N 18.41°E
- Country: Slovakia
- Region: Trenčín Region
- District: Považská Bystrica District
- First mentioned: 1327

Area
  - Total: 6.23 km^{2} (2.41 sq mi)
- Elevation: 302 m (991 ft)

Population (2025)
  - Total: 1,428
- Time zone: UTC+1 (CET)
  - Summer (DST): UTC+2 (CEST)
- Postal code: 170 1
- Area code: +421 42
- Vehicle registration plate (until 2022): PB
- Website: www.sverepec.sk

Sverepec (Hungarian: Lejtős) is a village in the Považská Bystrica District, Trenčín Region of northwestern Slovakia

== History ==
In historical records the village was first mentioned in 1321. From 1981 to 1990, it was part of Považská Bystrica.

== Geography ==
The municipality lies at an altitude of 302 metres (991 ft) and covers an area of 6.23 km^{2} (2.41 sq mi) (2025).

== Population ==
Population statistic (10 years)
Year	1995	2005	2015	2025
Count	1061	1103	1285	1428
Difference		+3.95%	+16.50%	+11.12%

Population statistic
Year	2024	2025
Count	1404	1428
Difference		+1.70%

It has a population of 1428 people (31 December 2025).

=== Ethnicity ===
Census 2021 (1+ %)
Ethnicity	Number	Fraction
Slovak	1306	96.31%
Not found out	50	3.68%
Total	1356	

In year 2021 was 1356 people by ethnicity 1306 as Slovak, 50 as Not found out, 13 as Czech, 2 as Moravian, 2 as Hungarian, 1 as Serbian, 1 as German, 1 as Other and 1 as English.

Note on population: The difference values of population numbers in the table "Population statistic" and in the sections "Ethnicity" & "Religion" is caused by the use of various statistical methods.

=== Religion ===
Census 2021 (1+ %)
Religion	Number	Fraction
Roman Catholic Church	1109	81.78%
None	160	11.8%
Not found out	49	3.61%
Greek Catholic Church	15	1.11%
Total	1356	

In year 2021 was 1356 people by religion 1109 from Roman Catholic Church, 160 from None, 49 from Not found out, 15 from Greek Catholic Church, 8 from Evangelical Church, 6 from Ad hoc movements, 3 from Christian Congregations in Slovakia, 3 from Other, 2 from Eastern Orthodox Church and 1 from Buddhism.
