= Tommy Searle =

English motocross & supercross racer (born 1989)

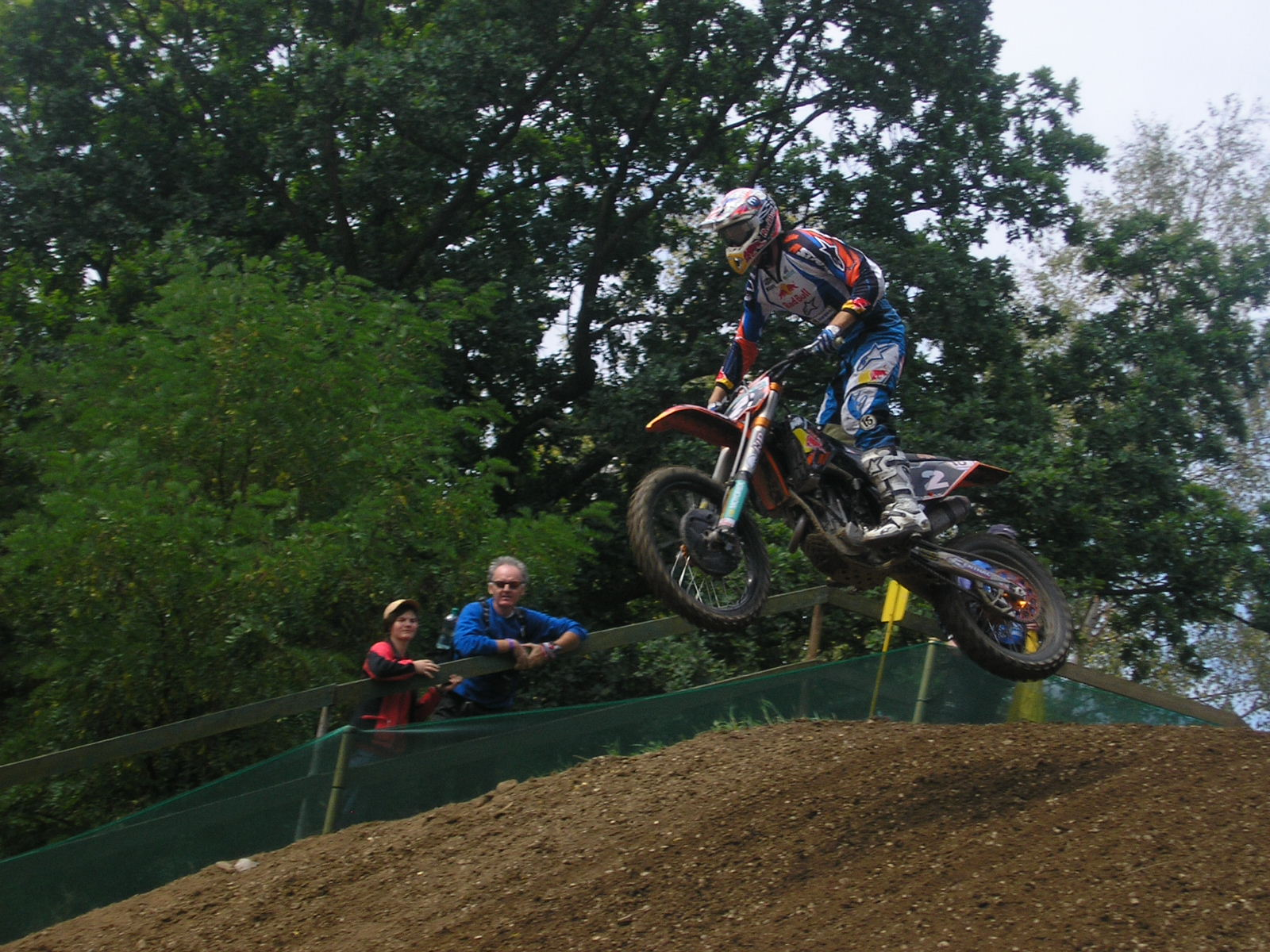
- Searle in the Czech GP in 2008
- Nationality: British
- Born: 13 June 1989 (age 37) Pembury, Kent, England

Motocross career
- Years active: 2005-Present
- Teams: Kawasaki, Red Bull Factory KTM, Buildbase Honda
- Championships: 2016 MX1 British Motocross Champion; 2019 MX1 British Motocross Champion; 2021 MX1 British Motocross Champion; 2022 MX1 British Motocross Champion; 2025 MX2 British Motocross Champion
- Wins: 14 MX2

Tommy Searle (born 13 June 1989) is an English professional motocross and supercross racer. He competed in the Motocross World Championships from 2005 to 2008 and competed in the AMA Motocross Championships in 2009 and 2010. He returned to the Motocross World Championships from 2011 to 2019. Searle is a three-time MX2 World vice-champion & a four-time British Motocross Champion. His fourteen MX2 Grand Prix victories make him Britain's most successful MX2 rider and ranks third in total victories across all classes to multiple world champions David Thorpe and Jeff Smith.

== 2005-2008 (MX2) ==
Born in Pembury, England, Searle was a five-times UK youth motocross champion. He made his world championship debut with the Molson Kawasaki MX2 World Championship team for the 2005 British motocross Grand Prix at Matchams Park. He scored his first podium result at the 2006 Swedish Grand Prix and finished the season ranked eighth in the MX2 World Championship final overall standings.

=== 2007 ===
In 2007, Searle continued to compete in the FIM MX2 Motocross World Championship, and confirmed his status as one of the best young talents in world motocross when, he finished second overall to Antonio Cairoli final standings, including moto wins at the Grand Prix of Sweden and Great Britain, and seven podium finishes.

=== 2008 ===
2008 saw Searle race to his most successful season to date, as he once again finished in second place overall in the MX2-GP Motocross World Championship. He remained in contention for first place until the last race of the season, but was edged out by South African rider Tyla Rattray. However, he won the Grand Prixs of Bulgaria, France, the Czech Republic and Citta di Faenza, and also scored podium finishes in Portugal, Italy, Great Britain, South Africa, Ireland and Benelux.

In January 2008, Searle signed a contract with KTM North America to compete in the AMA 2009 AMA MX Lites series. Pit Beirer, director of off-road racing at KTM, said of Searle 'His riding and rate of progression make him an excellent member of our MX2 team and we are now excited for his future achievements in the US'.

== Stint in the AMA Supercross/Motocross Nationals Series ==
In his first season racing in the U.S., Searle finished in sixth place in the 250 class of the 2009 AMA Motocross Championship. He made the podium three times, finishing 3rd overall at Mt. Morris, Lakewood and Buchanan. Searle's debut AMA Supercross season ended early when he injured his shoulder at the Anaheim Two meeting on 23 January. In the two rounds in which he competed before the injury, Searle finished seventh overall at the Anaheim One meeting, and eighth overall at the Phoenix meeting.

In 2010, Searle embarked on his second season in the 250 class of the AMA Motocross Championship, but once again his progress was hampered by injury, and he finished fourteenth overall after missing a number of races. His best result was a second place in the first moto of the opening round at Hangtown.

== 2011-2012 (MX2) ==
In August 2010, Searle left KTM and announced a return to the FIM MX-GP2 circuit with the CLS Monster Energy Kawasaki Pro Circuit team.

=== 2011 ===
Searle finished a strong third overall for the 2011 FIM Motocross World Championship season, behind Redbull Teka KTM riders Ken Roczen and Jeffrey Herlings. He secured overall wins at the Grand Prix of France and Europe, and also managed to finish on the podium at the Grand Prix of Bulgaria, Netherlands, the United States, Spain, Germany, Latvia, the Czech Republic, Britain and Italy. While fast throughout, he was often hindered by poor starts, meaning he would lose time by having to fight his way through the pack in the early laps of a moto, allowing the leaders - usually Roczen and Herlings - to pull away.

=== 2012 ===
In his final season in the MX-GP2 class, Searle once again finished runner-up in the championship standings, this time to Red Bull KTM Factory Racing Team rider Jeffrey Herlings. Mechanical DNFs in the first moto of the Italian GP, and in both motos of the Latvian GP, ultimately cost him his chance of taking the title. However, he still managed to secure overall wins at the GPs of Bulgaria, Brazil, Belgium, Sweden, Great Britain and Germany, and finished on the podium a further seven times, for a total of 13 podium finishes out of 16 GPs.

His victory at the GP of Great Britain in August 2012, the 13th of his career, saw him become - at the age of only 23 - the third most successful British motocross GP rider of all time in terms of number of GPs won, behind only former world champions Dave Thorpe and Jeff Smith.

== MXGP Career ==
In 2013, Searle remained with Team Floride Monster Energy Pro-Circuit Kawasaki, and embarked upon his first season in the premier MX-GP1 class. The opening round of the season saw Qatar host its first ever MX-GP event, in which Searle finished sixth overall. Similarly, round two also saw Thailand host its first ever MX-GP event, in which Searle finished fourth overall. In round three, the series returned to the more established climes of the Valkenswaad circuit in the Netherlands, in which Searle finished 9th overall.

On January 9, 2015, Searle announced his signing for the Red Bull KTM Factory Racing Team. He signed to compete in the 2020 British Motocross National Championship for the Buildbase Honda team managed by former world champion David Thorpe.

== MX2 Career Results ==
Year	Rnd 1	Rnd 2	Rnd 3	Rnd 4	Rnd 5	Rnd 6	Rnd 7	Rnd 8	Rnd 9	Rnd 10	Rnd 11	Rnd 12	Rnd 13	Rnd 14	Rnd 15	Rnd 16	Average Finish	Podium Percent	Place
2007 MX2	13	4	2	3	10	3	6	3	2	6	3	2	2	1	3	-	4.20	67%	2nd
2008 MX2	4	6	3	1	3	3	1	5	4	1	3	1	2	2	1	-	2.67	73%	2nd
2011 MX2	2	3	3	4	1	7	2	11	3	3	6	3	2	1	2	-	3.53	73%	3rd
2012 MX2	3	1	9	2	1	2	2	1	1	DNF	2	2	1	4	2	1	2.13	87%	2nd
