= Billy MacKenzie (motorcyclist) =

Scottish motorcycle racer

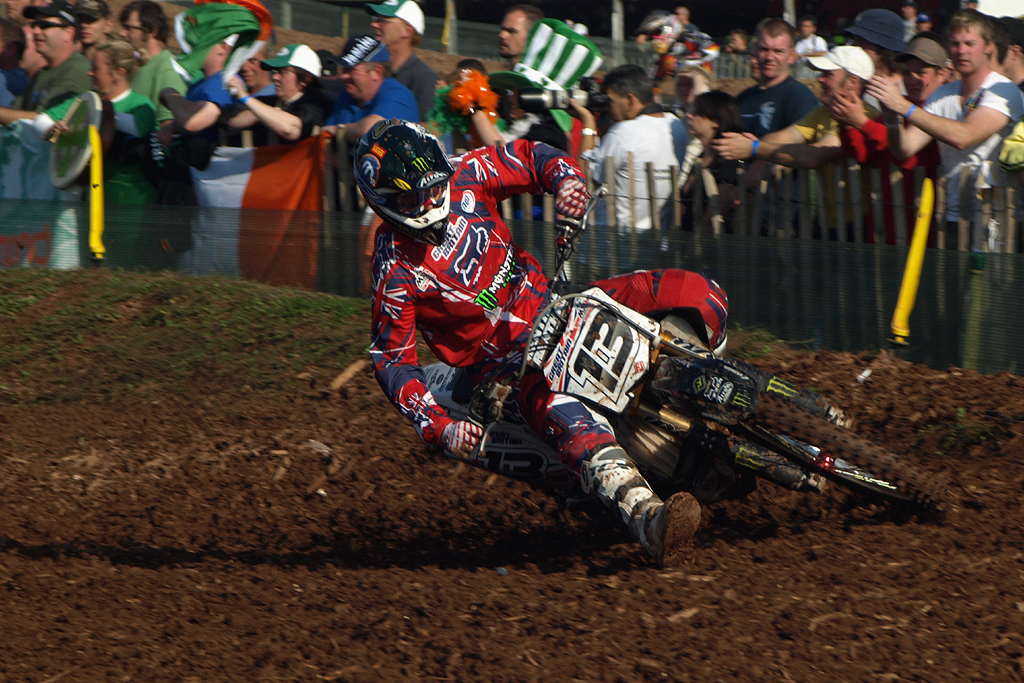
- Nationality: British
- Born: 7 April 1984 (age 41) Edinburgh, Scotland

Motocross career
- Years active: 1999–2013
- Teams: Factory Kawasaki, CAS Honda, Dixon Yamaha
- Championships: MX1 British Champion 2007, MX1 British Champion 2008
- Wins: 1
- GP debut: 1999 125cc German Grand Prix
- First GP win: 2007 MX-1 Japanese Grand Prix

Billy MacKenzie (born 7 April 1984 in Edinburgh) is a Scottish former professional motocross racer. He competed in the Motocross World Championships from 1999 to 2013. MacKenzie is a two-time British Motocross Champion.

MacKenzie rode for the Honda factory racing team competing in the F.I.M. MX1-GP World Championships. He has also represented the United Kingdom in the Motocross des Nations. MacKenzie recorded his first and only World Championship victory when he won the MX-1 Class at the 2007 Japanese Motocross Grand Prix. In 2010, MacKenzie rode for Kawasaki in Australia.
