= List of Colby College alumni =

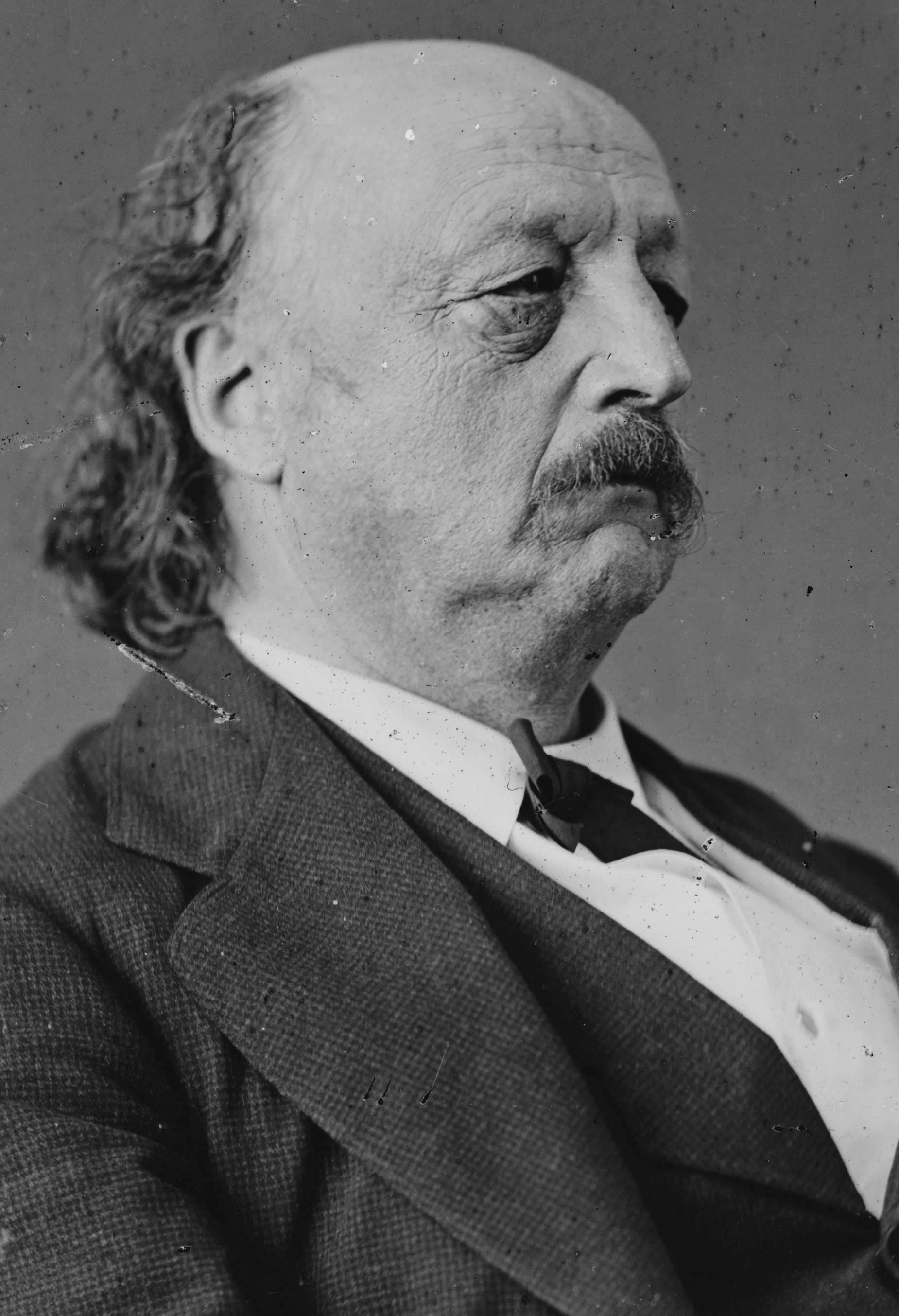
Civil War General and Governor of Massachusetts Benjamin Franklin Butler, class of 1838

This list of Colby College alumni includes graduates, non-graduate former students, current students, and honorary degree recipients of Colby College. Colby, which was founded in 1813, has a total of more than 25,000 living alumni.

== Academia ==
=== Educators ===
Name	Class	Notability	Reference
Martin Brewer Anderson	1840	President of the University of Rochester 1853–1888	
Theophilus C. Abbot	1845	President of State Agricultural College (now Michigan State University) 1862–1885	
Nathan Cook Brackett	1864 (transfer)	founder of Storer College and Bluefield State College	
Edward Bennett Mathews	1891	Professor of Mineralogy and Petrography at Johns Hopkins University	
George Perley Phenix	1883	President of Hampton University, and teacher	
Shailer Mathews	1884	Dean of the University of Chicago Divinity School, 1908–1933	
George Ricker Berry	1885	Semitic scholar and professor at Colgate Rochester Crozer Divinity School	
Arthur J. Roberts	1890	President of Colby College, 1908–1927	
Franklin W. Johnson	1891	President of Colby College, 1929–1942	
Charles Huntington Whitman	1897	Chair of the Department of English at Rutgers University 1911–1937	
Gordon Enoch Gates	1919	Head of Biology Department University of Yangon, 1921–1941	
David G. Bromley	1963	Author and professor of Sociology at Virginia Commonwealth University	
Jerrold Lee Shapiro	1964	Director of the Center for Professional Development at Santa Clara University	
Thomas Easton	1966	Professor of Biology at Thomas College	
William "Bill" McKinney	1968	President and professor of American Religion of Pacific School of Religion, 1996–2010	
Ted Snyder	1975	Dean of Yale School of Management, dean of University of Chicago Booth School of Business 2001–2010	
Gregory R. Ciottone	1987	Harvard professor, pioneering physician in counter-terrorism medicine, White House consultant	
Mark Panek	1990	Professor of English at the University of Hawaii	
David Roderick	1992	Assistant professor of English at University of North Carolina at Greensboro	

=== Research and scholarship ===
Name	Class	Notability	Reference
Julius Dresser	ex-1860	Philosopher	
Charles Branch Wilson	1884	Scientist, marine biologist	
Fenwicke Holmes	1906	Author, congregational minister, and religious science leader	
Harold Calvin Marston Morse	1914	Mathematician	
Paul Wallace Gates	1924	United States land policy historian and author	
Doris Kearns Goodwin	1964	Presidential scholar and historian; notable works include the Pulitzer Prize-winning No Ordinary Time (1995) and Team of Rivals (2005)	
Arthur G. Miller	1964	Professor in Art History and Archaeology at the University of Maryland, College Park	
Earle G. Shettleworth Jr.	1970	Maine State Historian	
Alan Taylor	1977	Scholar in early Colonial America history and Pulitzer Prize winner	
Craig A. Carlson	1986	Oceanographer	

== Arts and entertainment ==
Name	Class	Notability	Reference
Jack Levine	1946	Painter	
Loring Buzzell	1948	Music publisher and record label executive	
Gordon W. Bowie	1965	Musician	
Rocco Landesman	1969	Chair of the National Endowment for the Arts	
Kathy O'Dell	1973	Art historian, theorist, curator, arts advocate, author	
Tim O'Brien	ex-1973	Country and bluegrass musician	
Tom Silverman	1976	Founder of hip-hop record label Tommy Boy Entertainment	
Arthur Levering	1976	Composer	
Lincoln Peirce	1985	Cartoonist and creator of the comic strip Big Nate	
Billy Bush	1994	Host of Access Hollywood, former host of Let's Make a Deal and The Billy Bush Show	
Mike Daisey	1996	Monologuist, solo performer and author	

== Athletics ==
Name	Class	Notability	Reference
Frank Haggerty	1897	Head football coach at University of Akron, 1910–1914	
Jack Coombs	1906	Two-time World Champion Major League Baseball player; manager (Philadelphia Phillies and Duke University)	
Elbridge Ross	1935	Medalist at the 1936 Winter Olympics in hockey	
Norm Gigon	1958	Major League Baseball player for the Chicago Cubs	
Ed Phillips	1966	Major League Baseball pitcher for the 1970 Boston Red Sox	
Jan Volk	1968	General manager of the Boston Celtics, 1984–1997	
Sebsibe Mamo	1970	Ethiopian athlete; competed at the 1964 and 1968 Summer Olympics	
Greg Cronin	1986	Assistant coach of the Toronto Maple Leafs, 2011–present	
Mike McRae	1981	Head coach of the Canisius Golden Griffins baseball team, 2005–present	
Eric DeCosta	1993	Executive vice president and general manager, Baltimore Ravens	
Hilary Gehman	1993	Olympic rower, Sydney 2000 and Athens 2004; World Rowing Championships medalist	
Brian O'Halloran	1993	General manager of the Boston Red Sox	
Mark Jackson	1994	Athletic director for Villanova University	
Meaghan Sittler	1998	Hockey player for the Brampton Thunder and the United States women's national ice hockey team	
Courtney Kennedy	ex-2001	Olympic medalist on the United States women's national ice hockey team, 2002 and 2006	
Warner Nickerson	2005	Alpine skier	
Dan Vassallo	2007	Distance runner	

== Business and finance ==
Name	Class	Notability	Reference
Ivory Quinby	1836	Businessman and philanthropist	
J. Young Scammon	1869	Lawyer, banker, and newspaper publisher	
Herbert Elijah Wadsworth	1892	Businessman	
Alice Mason	1945	Manhattan real estate broker	
Albert Stone	1951	Owner of Sterilite	
Frank R. Wallace	1954	Owner of Integrated Management Associates	
Lawrence Pugh	1956	Former CEO of the VF Corporation	
Tom Whidden	1970	President of North Sails, 1992–present	
Robert Diamond	1973	Former chief executive officer of Barclays Bank, Plc.	
Edson Mitchell	1975	Director, Deutsche Bank	
Eric S. Rosengren	1979	President and chief executive officer of the Federal Reserve Bank of Boston	
Dawn Sweeney	1981	President and chief executive officer of the National Restaurant Association	
Michael Federle	1981	Chief executive officer of the Forbes Media	
Chip Smith	1991	Co-founder of The Glover Park Group	
Mira Murati	2011	CTO and former interim CEO of OpenAI	

== Literature ==
Name	Class	Notability	Reference
William Hutchinson Rowe	c.1900	Historian and author	
Roland Gammon	1937	Religious author and ad-man	
Thomas Savage	1940	Novelist	
Alvin Schwartz	1949	Author of the series Scary Stories to Tell in the Dark	
Robert B. Parker	1954	Author of the Spenser detective novels	
Joe Perham	1955	Humorist	
Annie Proulx	ex-1957	Pulitzer Prize-winning author of The Shipping News and Brokeback Mountain	
Don J. Snyder	1968	Novelist and screenwriter	
Gregory White Smith	1973	Pulitzer Prize-winning author of Jackson Pollock: An American Saga	
Neil Raymond Ricco	1970s	Poet and writer	
Jeff Gottesfeld	1977	Novelist, Anne Frank and Me; screen/TV writer, The Young and the Restless	
Alan Taylor	1977	Pulitzer Prize and Bancroft Prize-winning author and historian specializing in early American history	
Jane Brox	1978	Author and 2007 Guggenheim Fellow	
Geoffrey Becker	1980	Short story writer	
Linda Greenlaw	1983	Author of Hungry Ocean (captain of the Hannah Boden, sister ship to the Andrea Gail which went down in the "Perfect Storm" 1991)	
Erika Mailman	1991	Author and journalist	
Cecily von Ziegesar	1992	Novelist, creator of Gossip Girl series	
Stephanie Doyon	1993	Novelist, best known for The Greatest Man in Cedar Hole	
Sarah Langan	1996	Bram Stoker Award-winning novelist	
Drew Magary	1998	Writer for Deadspin and GQ magazine; author of The Postmortal and Someone Could Get Hurt	
Rosecrans Baldwin	1999	Novelist and essayist, co-founder of The Morning News	
David Barr Kirtley	2000	Science fiction author and co-founder of Geek's Guide to the Galaxy	

== Media ==
Name	Class	Notability	Reference
George Horace Lorimer	1898	Editor-in-chief of The Saturday Evening Post	
John Roderick	1937	Correspondent for the Associated Press	
Dwight E. Sargent	1939	Editorial writer for The New York Herald Tribune, 1951 Nieman Fellow	
Elliot G. Jaspin	1969	1979 winner of the Pulitzer Prize for Investigative Reporting	
Stuart Rothenberg	1970	Editor and publisher of The Rothenberg Political Report, CNN political analyst, and syndicated columnist	
Ben Bradlee Jr.	1970	Investigative journalist and bestselling author	
Robert S. Capers	1971	1992 winner of the Pulitzer Prize for Explanatory Reporting	
Stéphane Cornicard	1988	Film actor and director	
Andrea Nix Fine	1991	Oscar winner, 2013 Best Documentary Short Subject	
Amy Walter	1991	Political director of ABC News, former house editor for the Cook Political Report, editor in chief of The Hotline	
Dan Harris	1993	ABC News anchor and reporter	
Billy Bush	1994	TV personality and nephew of President George H. W. Bush	
Hannah Beech	1995	Journalist for Time magazine	
Sarah Lee	1995	Washington DC news reporter	
Matt Apuzzo	2000	2012 winner of the Pulitzer Prize for Investigative Reporting	

== Politics and government ==
=== Members of the United States Congress ===
Name	Class	Notability	Reference
Virgil D. Parris	ex-1827	U.S. representative from Maine 1837–1840	
Daniel T. Jewett	ex-1830	U.S. senator from Missouri 1870–1871	
James Brooks	1831	U.S. representative from New York 1849–1853, 1863–1866, 1867–1873	
Wyman B. S. Moor	1831	U.S. senator from Maine 1848, Maine attorney general 1844–1847	
James S. Wiley	1836	U.S. representative from Maine, 1847–1849	
Benjamin Franklin Butler	1838	U.S. representative from Massachusetts 1867–1875, 1877–1879, Civil War general, 33rd governor of Massachusetts	
Stephen Coburn	1839	U.S. representative from Maine, 1861	
Benjamin White Norris	1843	U.S. representative from Alabama, 1868–1869	
Mark H. Dunnell	1849	U.S. representative from Minnesota 1871–1883, 1889–1891	
Seth L. Milliken	ex-1852	U.S. representative from Maine 1883–1897	
Nelson Dingley Jr.	1855	U.S. representative from Maine 1881–1899, 34th governor of Maine 1874–1876	
Alfred Eliab Buck	1859	U.S. representative from Alabama 1869–1871, U.S. ambassador to Japan, 1897–1902	
Richard C. Shannon	1862	U.S. representative from New York 1895–1899, envoy extraordinary and minister plenipotentiary to El Salvador, Nicaragua, and Costa Rica 1891–1893	
Forrest Goodwin	1880	U.S. representative from Maine, 1913	
Asher Hinds	1883	U.S. representative from Maine, 1911–1917	
John E. Nelson	1898	U.S. representative from Maine, 1921–1933	
Angier Goodwin	1902	U.S. representative from Massachusetts, 1943–1955	
Charles P. Nelson	1928	U.S. representative from Maine, 1949–1957	
Chester Earl Merrow	1929	U.S. representative from New Hampshire, 1943–1963	
Edward Gurney	1935	U.S. senator from Florida (1969–1974)	

=== United States federal and state court judges ===
Name	Class	Notability	Reference
Percival Bonney	1863	Maine Superior Court judge, 1878–1906	
Leslie C. Cornish	1875	Chief justice of the Maine Supreme Judicial Court, 1917–1925	
Warren C. Philbrook	1882	Mayor of Waterville 1899–1900, Maine attorney general, 1909–1910, justice of the Maine Supreme Judicial Court, 1913–1928	
Hugh Dean McLellan	1895	Federal judge on the United States District Court for the District of Massachusetts	
Nathaniel Tompkins	1903	Justice of the Maine Supreme Judicial Court, 1945–1949	
Joseph Jabar	1968	Justice of the Maine Supreme Judicial Court, 2009–present	
Kenneth R. Melvin	1974	Circuit court judge and member of the Virginia House of Delegates	

=== United States governors ===
Name	Class	Notability	Reference
Samuel Cony	ex-1829	31st governor of Maine, 1864–1867	
George A. Ramsdell	ex-1857	46th governor of New Hampshire 1897–1899	
Harris M. Plaisted	1853	Governor of Maine 1881–1883	
Llewellyn Powers	ex-1861	Governor of Maine 1901–1908	
Marcellus Stearns	1863	Governor of Florida 1874–1877	
Janet T. Mills	ex-1965	Governor of Maine 2019–present	

=== Other political and legal figures ===
Name	Class	Notability	Reference
Albert G. Jewett	1823	United States chargé d'affaires to Peru 1845–1847	
Elijah P. Lovejoy	1826	Abolitionist	
Manly B. Townsend	1828	Maine state senator	
Edgar Harkness Gray	1838	Baptist clergyman and former chaplain of the Senate	
Leonard Swett	c. 1840-45	Close friend of President Lincoln and an organizer for the 1860 Chicago Republican National Convention	
Josiah Hayden Drummond	1846	16th attorney general of Maine, 1860–1863	
Isaac Smith Kalloch	1852	Baptist minister, founder and first president of Ottawa University, mayor of San Francisco, California	
Cyrus Hamlin	1859	General in the Union Army	
Bartlett Tripp	ex-1861	Ambassador to Austria 1893–1897	
Henry C. Merriam	ex-1862	United States Army general, awarded Medal of Honor	
Edwin Francis Lyford	1877	Massachusetts state senator, 1894	
Herbert Lord	1884	Director of the United States Bureau of the Budget (now the Office of Management and Budget), 1922–1929	
Byron Boyd	1886	Secretary of state of Maine, 1897–1907	
Holman Day	1887	Military secretary to the Governor of Maine John Fremont Hill, 1901–1904	
Merton L. Miller	1890	Acting chief of the Ethnological Survey for the Philippine Islands	
George Otis Smith	1893	Director of United States Geological Survey, 1907–1922, first chairman of the Federal Power Commission	
Robert N. Anthony	1938	United States under secretary of defense (comptroller), 1965–1968	
Rachel Bubar Kelly	1947	Prohibition Party candidate for United States vice president	
Robert S. Gelbard	1964	U.S. ambassador to Bolivia (1988–1991) and Indonesia (1999–2001)	
Peter D. Hart	1964	Founder of Peter D. Hart Research Associates, a political polling organization	
Pete Rouse	1968	Chief of staff to President Barack Obama, former senior advisor to President Barack Obama, former chief of staff to Tom Daschle	
Patrick Duddy	1972	U.S. ambassador to Venezuela 2007–2010	
Arthur L. Bell	1974	Maine state representative	
David Lemoine	1978	State treasurer of Maine 2005–2010	
David Linsky	1979	Massachusetts House of Representatives	
Peter Forman	1980	Minority leader of the Massachusetts House of Representatives, 1991–1995	
Christopher Mellon	1980	Staff director of the Senate Select Committee on Intelligence, 1989–1999	
Thomas A. Betro	1981	Director of the Naval Criminal Investigative Service 2006–2010	
Daniel Shagoury	1982	Maine House of Representatives	
Dana Hanley	1984	Member of the Maine Senate, 1992–1996	
Paul Doyle	1985	Connecticut senator from the Ninth District	
Sean McCormack	1986	Assistant secretary for Public Affairs; U.S. State Department spokesman	
Daniel K. Webster	1987	Massachusetts state representative, 2003–2013	
Michael Marcello	1990	Member of the Rhode Island House of Representatives 2009–2017	
J. Patrick O'Neill	1993	Member of the Rhode Island House of Representatives 2005–2015	
Andrew Monroe Rice	1996	2008 Democratic nominee, candidate, United States Senate (Oklahoma) (lost to Senator James Inhofe)	
Devin Beliveau	2001	Maine state representative from District 151, 2010–2012	
Linwood E. Palmer Jr.		Maine legislator, candidate, Maine governor, 1978	
Daniel T. Jewett		Republican US senator (Missouri) 1870–71, Missouri state representative	
Elizabeth Hanson	2002	CIA officer killed in the Camp Chapman attack, Afghanistan	
Lot M. Morrill		U.S. senator (1861–69), governor of Maine (1857–1861), treasury secretary (1876–77)	
Brendan Crighton	2005	Massachusetts state senator, 2018–present	
Charles L. Phillips	1878	U.S. Army brigadier general	
David Russell		Member of the New Hampshire House of Representatives 2000-2012, 2014-2016	

== Others ==
Name	Class	Notability	Reference
George Boardman	1822	First graduate of Colby College, Baptist missionary	
Horace G. Cates		Los Angeles County, California coroner	
Mary Caffrey Low	1875	Founder, Sigma Kappa sorority	
Elizabeth Gorham Hoag		Founder, Sigma Kappa sorority	
Ida Fuller		Founder, Sigma Kappa sorority	
Frances Elliott Mann Hall		Founder, Sigma Kappa sorority	
Louise Helen Coburn		Founder, Sigma Kappa sorority	
Arthur B. Patten	1890	United States Congregational Church clergyman	
Bern Porter	1932	Artist and scientist	
Stephen Sternberg	1941	Pathologist and author	
Myron "Pinky" Thompson	1950	Trustee of the Bishop Estate (now known as Kamehameha Schools), president of the Polynesian Voyaging Society	
Riki Ott	1976	Marine toxicologist oil spill expert	
Savas (Zembillas) of Pittsburgh	1979	Bishop of the Greek Orthodox Metropolis of Pittsburgh	
Wylie Dufresne	1992	Chef and owner of wd~50 restaurant in New York City, featured as a judge on Top Chef	
Tara Allain	2008	Miss Maine 2007	

== See also ==
- List of Colby College faculty
