= 1874 in the United States =

- Decades: 1850s; 1860s; 1870s; 1880s; 1890s
- See also: History of the United States (1865–1918); Timeline of the history of the United States (1860-1899); List of years in the United States

Events from the year 1874 in the United States.

== Incumbents ==
=== Federal government ===
- President: Ulysses S. Grant (R-Illinois)
- Vice President: Henry Wilson (R-Massachusetts)
- Chief Justice: Morrison Waite (Ohio) (starting March 4)
- Speaker of the House of Representatives: James G. Blaine (R-Maine)
- Congress: 43rd

==== State governments ====
Governors and lieutenant governors

=== Governors ===
- Governor of Alabama: David P. Lewis (Republican) (until November 24), George S. Houston (Democratic) (starting November 24)
- Governor of Arkansas: Elisha Baxter (Republican) (until November 12), Augustus Hill Garland (Democratic) (starting November 12)
- Governor of California: Newton Booth (Republican)
- Governor of Connecticut: Charles R. Ingersoll (Democratic)
- Governor of Delaware: James Ponder (Democratic)
- Governor of Florida: Ossian B. Hart (Republican) (until March 18), Marcellus Stearns (Republican) (starting March 18)
- Governor of Georgia: James M. Smith (Democratic)
- Governor of Illinois: John Lourie Beveridge (Republican)
- Governor of Indiana: Thomas A. Hendricks (Democratic)
- Governor of Iowa: Cyrus C. Carpenter (Republican)
- Governor of Kansas: Thomas A. Osborn (Republican)
- Governor of Kentucky: Preston H. Leslie (Democratic)
- Governor of Louisiana: William Pitt Kellogg (Republican)
- Governor of Maine: Sidney Perham (Republican) (until January 7), Nelson Dingley Jr. (Republican Party) (starting January 7)
- Governor of Maryland: William Pinkney Whyte (Democratic) (until March 4), James B. Groome (Democratic) (starting March 4)
- Governor of Massachusetts: William B. Washburn (Republican) (until April 29), Thomas Talbot (Republican) (starting April 29)
- Governor of Michigan: John J. Bagley (Republican)
- Governor of Minnesota: Horace Austin (Republican) (until January 7), Cushman K. Davis (Republican) (starting January 7)
- Governor of Mississippi: Ridgley C. Powers (Republican) (until January 4), Adelbert Ames (Republican) (starting January 4)
- Governor of Missouri: Silas Woodson (Democratic)
- Governor of Nebraska: Robert Wilkinson Furnas (Republican)
- Governor of Nevada: Lewis R. Bradley (Democratic)
- Governor of New Hampshire: Ezekiel A. Straw (Republican) (until June 3), James A. Weston (Democratic) (starting June 3)
- Governor of New Jersey: Joel Parker (Democratic)
- Governor of New York: John Adams Dix (Republican) (until end of December 31)
- Governor of North Carolina: Tod Robinson Caldwell (Republican) (until July 11), Curtis Hooks Brogden (Republican) (starting July 11)
- Governor of Ohio: Edward F. Noyes (Republican) (until January 12), William Allen (Democratic) (starting January 12)
- Governor of Oregon: La Fayette Grover (Democratic)
- Governor of Pennsylvania: John F. Hartranft (Republican)
- Governor of Rhode Island: Henry Howard (Republican)
- Governor of South Carolina: Franklin I. Moses, Jr. (Republican) (until December 1), Daniel Henry Chamberlain (Republican) (starting December 1)
- Governor of Tennessee: John C. Brown (Democratic)
- Governor of Texas: Edmund J. Davis (Republican) (until January 15), Richard Coke (Democratic) (starting January 15)
- Governor of Vermont: Julius Converse (Republican) (until October 8), Asahel Peck (Republican) (starting October 8)
- Governor of Virginia: Gilbert Carlton Walker (Democratic) (until January 1), James L. Kemper (Democratic) (starting January 1)
- Governor of West Virginia: John J. Jacob (Democratic)/(Independent)
- Governor of Wisconsin: Cadwallader C. Washburn (Republican) (until January 5), William Robert Taylor (Democratic) (starting January 5)

=== Lieutenant governors ===
- Lieutenant Governor of Alabama: Alexander McKinstry (Republican) (until November 26), Robert F. Ligon (Democratic) (starting November 26)
- Lieutenant Governor of Arkansas: Volney V. Smith (Republican) (until November 12), abolished thereafter
- Lieutenant Governor of California: Romualdo Pacheco (Republican)
- Lieutenant Governor of Connecticut: George G. Sill (Republican)
- Lieutenant Governor of Florida: Marcellus Stearns (Republican) (until month and day unknown), vacant (starting month and day unknown)
- Lieutenant Governor of Illinois: John Early (Republican)
- Lieutenant Governor of Indiana: Leonidas Sexton (Republican)
- Lieutenant Governor of Iowa: Henry C. Bulis (Republican) (until month and day unknown), Joseph Dysart (Republican) (starting month and day unknown)
- Lieutenant Governor of Kansas: Elias Sleeper Stover (Republican)
- Lieutenant Governor of Kentucky: John G. Carlisle (Democratic)
- Lieutenant Governor of Louisiana: Caesar Antoine (Republican)
- Lieutenant Governor of Massachusetts: Thomas Talbot (political party unknown)
- Lieutenant Governor of Michigan: Henry H. Holt (Republican)
- Lieutenant Governor of Minnesota: William H. Yale (Republican) (until January 9), Alphonso Barto (Republican) (starting January 9)
- Lieutenant Governor of Mississippi: Alexander K. Davis (Republican)
- Lieutenant Governor of Missouri: Charles Phillip Johnson (Liberal Republican)
- Lieutenant Governor of Nevada: Frank Denver (political party unknown) (until month and day unknown), Pressly C. Hyman (political party unknown) (starting month and day unknown)
- Lieutenant Governor of New York: John C. Robinson (Republican) (until end of December 31)
- Lieutenant Governor of North Carolina: Curtis H. Brogden (Republican) (until month and day unknown), vacant (starting month and day unknown)
- Lieutenant Governor of Ohio: Jacob Mueller (Republican) (until January 12), Alphonso Hart (Republican) (starting January 12)
- Lieutenant Governor of Rhode Island: Charles C. Van Zandt (political party unknown)
- Lieutenant Governor of South Carolina: Richard Howell Gleaves (Republican)
- Lieutenant Governor of Tennessee: John C. Vaughn (Democratic) (until month and day unknown), A. T. Lacey (Democratic) (starting month and day unknown)
- Lieutenant Governor of Texas: vacant (until January 15), Richard B. Hubbard (Democratic) (starting January 15)
- Lieutenant Governor of Vermont: Russell S. Taft (Republican) (until October 8), Lyman G. Hinckley (Republican) (starting October 8)
- Lieutenant Governor of Virginia: John Lawrence Marye Jr. (Conservative) (until January 1), Robert E. Withers (Democratic) (starting January 1)
- Lieutenant Governor of Wisconsin: vacant (until January 5), Charles D. Parker (Democratic) (starting January 5)

== Events ==
- January 1 – New York City annexes The Bronx.
- February 21 – The Oakland Daily Tribune publishes its first newspaper.
- March 18 – Hawaii signs a treaty with the United States granting exclusive trading rights.
- March – The Young Men's Hebrew Association in Manhattan (which still operates today as the 92nd Street Y) is founded.
- May 16 – The Mill River dam collapses in Massachusetts, killing 139 people.
- July 1
  - Philadelphia Zoo opens, the first public zoo in the U.S.
  - Four-year-old Charley Ross, America's first major kidnapping for ransom victim, is taken from his home in Philadelphia.
  - The Sholes and Glidden typewriter, with cylindrical platen and QWERTY keyboard, is first marketed.
- November 4 – Democrats regain the U.S. House of Representatives for the first time since 1860.
- November 7 – Harper's Weekly publishes a political cartoon by Thomas Nast considered the first important use of an elephant as a symbol for the Republican Party.
- November 9 – The Sigma Kappa sorority is founded at Colby College in Waterville, Maine, by Mary Caffrey Low, Elizabeth Gorham Hoag, Ida Fuller, Frances Mann, and Louise Helen Coburn.
- November 11 – The Gamma Phi Beta sorority is founded at Syracuse University. This is the first women's Greek letter organization to be called a sorority.
- November 24 – Inventor Joseph Glidden patents barbed wire.
- November 25 – The United States Greenback Party is established as a "National Independent" political party, composed primarily of farmers financially hurt by the Panic of 1873.
- November 28 – King Kalākaua's 1874–75 state visit to the United States begins when the ship carrying him from Hawaii, USS Benicia, docks in San Francisco.

=== Undated ===
- The San Diego Natural History Museum is founded.
- Eastern Parkway in Brooklyn, laid out by Frederick Law Olmsted and Calvert Vaux, is completed.

=== Ongoing ===
- Reconstruction era (1865–1877)
- Gilded Age (1869–c. 1896)
- Depression of 1873–79 (1873–1879)

== Births ==
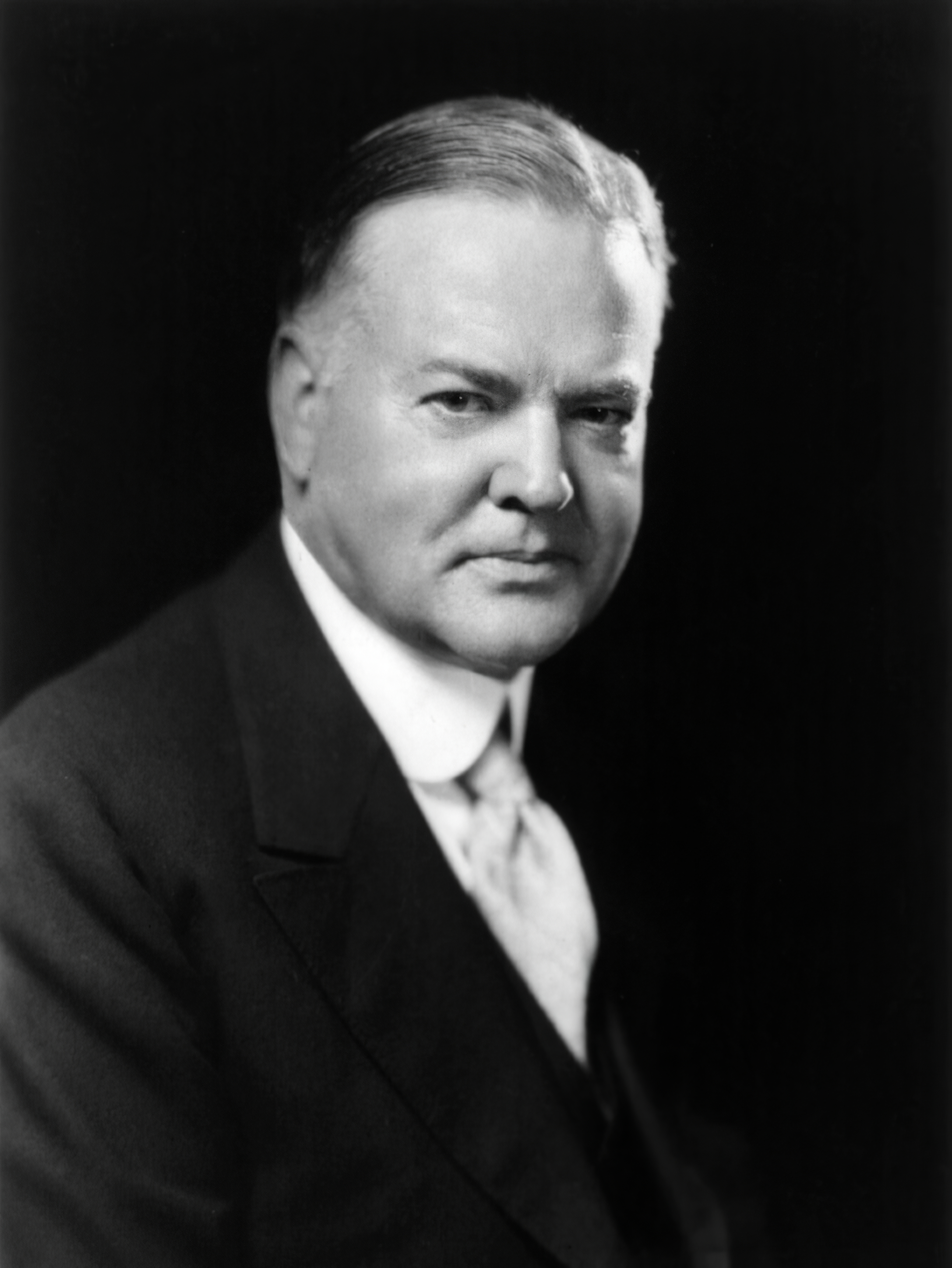
Herbert Hoover

- January 4 – John Thomas, U.S. Senator from Idaho from 1928 to 1933 and from 1940 to 1945 (died 1945)
- January 7 – M. M. Logan, U.S. Senator from Kentucky from 1931 to 1939 (died 1939)
- January 9 – Helen Tufts Bailie, social reformer and activist (died 1962)
- January 29 – John D. Rockefeller Jr., financier and philanthropist, son of John D. Rockefeller (died 1960)
- February 2 – William T. Innes, writer, ichthyologist, publisher (died 1969)
- March 4 – Stephen Victor Graham, United States Navy Rear Admiral and 18th Governor of American Samoa (died 1955)
- March 8 – Charles Weeghman, restaurateur and owner of Chicago Cubs (died 1938)
- April 5 – Jesse H. Jones, entrepreneur, 9th United States Secretary of Commerce (died 1956)
- April 16 – Frederick Van Nuys, U.S. Senator from Indiana from 1933 to 1944 (died 1944)
- March 5 – Daniel O. Hastings, U.S. Senator from Delaware from 1928 to 1937 (died 1966)
- March 26 – Robert Frost, poet (died 1963)
- March 29 – Lou Henry Hoover, First Lady of the United States as wife of Herbert Hoover (died 1944)
- May 20 – Augustine Lonergan, U.S. Senator from Connecticut from 1933 to 1939 (died 1947)
- July 1 – Edward P. Costigan, U.S. Senator from Colorado from 1931 to 1937 (died 1939)
- July 3 – Margaret G. Hays, comics writer and artist (died 1925)
- August 5 – Mayme Schweble, gold miner and politician (died 1943)
- August 10
  - Herbert Hoover, 31st president of the United States from 1929 to 1933 (died 1964)
  - Tod Sloan, jockey (died 1933)
- September 13 – Henry F. Ashurst, U.S. Senator from Arizona from 1912 to 1941 (died 1962)
- December 4 – Edwin S. Broussard, U.S. Senator from Louisiana from 1921 to 1933 (died 1934)

== Deaths ==
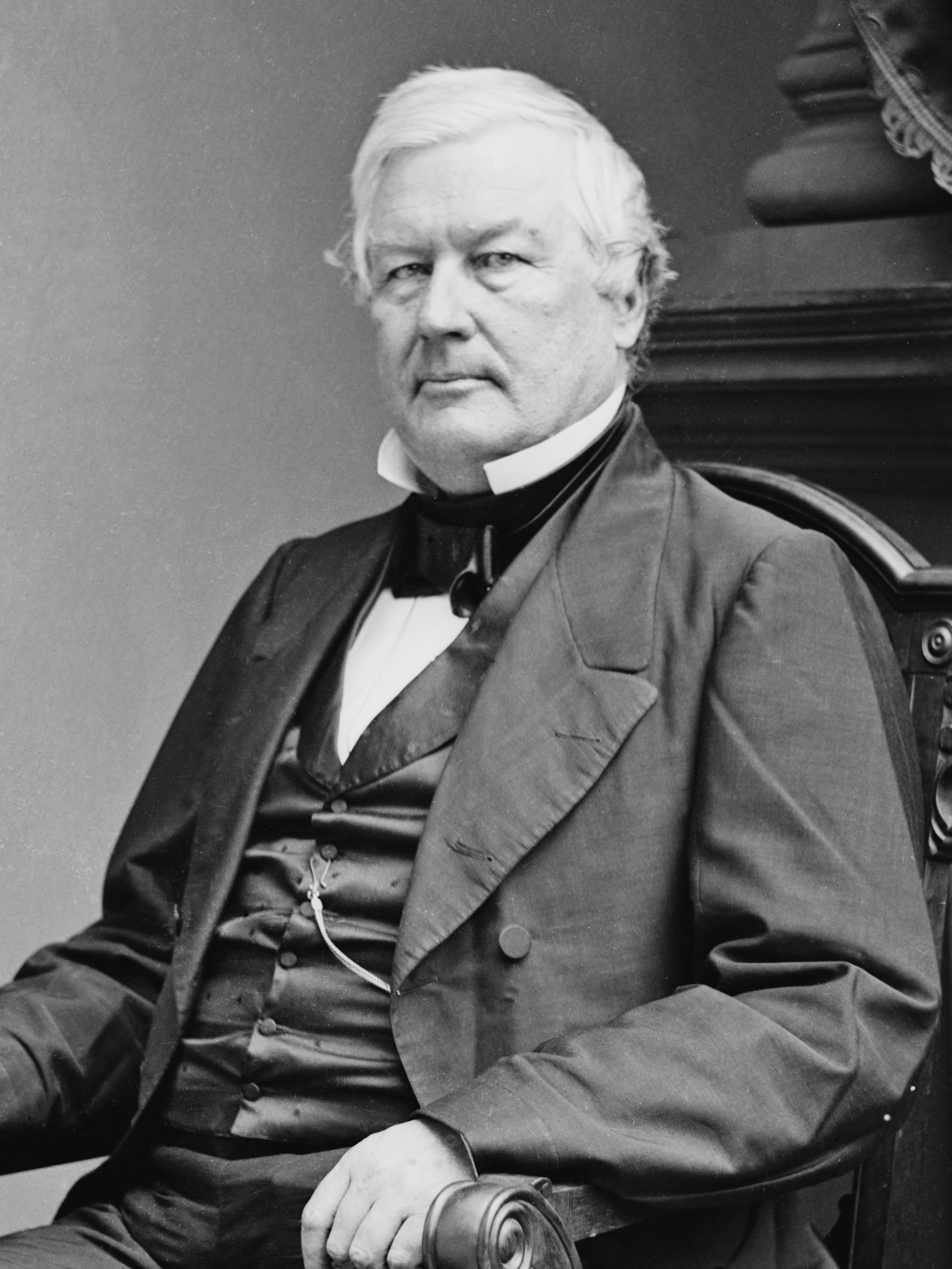
Millard Fillmore

- January 7 – John Burton Thompson, U.S. Senator from Kentucky from 1853 to 1859 (born 1810)
- January 17 – Chang and Eng Bunker, Thai-American conjoined twin brothers (born 1811)
- February 24 – John Bachman, Lutheran minister, social activist and naturalist (born 1790)
- March 8 – Millard Fillmore, 13th president of the U.S. from 1850 to 1853, and 12th vice president of the U.S. from 1849 to 1850 (born 1800)
- March 11 – Charles Sumner, U.S. Senator from Massachusetts from 1851 to 1874 (born 1811)
- June 8 – Cochise, one of the greatest leaders of the Apache Indians, dies on the Chiricahua reservation in southeastern Arizona
- October 6 – Samuel M. Kier, industrialist (born 1813)
- November 20 – Jackson Morton, U.S. Senator from Florida from 1849 to 1855 (born 1794)
- December 12 – Eugène Hilarian Abadie, U.S. Army Surgeon (born 1810)
- Full date unknown
  - Paul Jennings, slave of James Madison, writer (born 1799)
  - Eliza Seymour Lee, pastry chef and restaurateur (born 1800)

== See also ==
- Timeline of United States history (1860–1899)
