= Colby College student organizations =

Student organizations at Colby College include student-run government and publications. The college does not allow sororities and fraternities.

== Student Government Association ==
Students established the Student Government Association (SGA) to "enhance the student community." The SGA is headed by an elected president, and includes class presidents, dorm representatives, a finance chair, and a publicity chair and other positions. The SGA has representation on the Colby College Board of Trustees and every all-college committee; additionally, the SGA represents the official student body to the Faculty operated College Affairs Council and President's Council.

The SGA distributes funding to all student operated clubs and organizations on campus. The Pugh Community Board (PCB) and the Student Planning Board (SPB) are the largest organizations that plan lectures, concerts, and other major student events.

== Publications ==
=== The Colby Echo ===
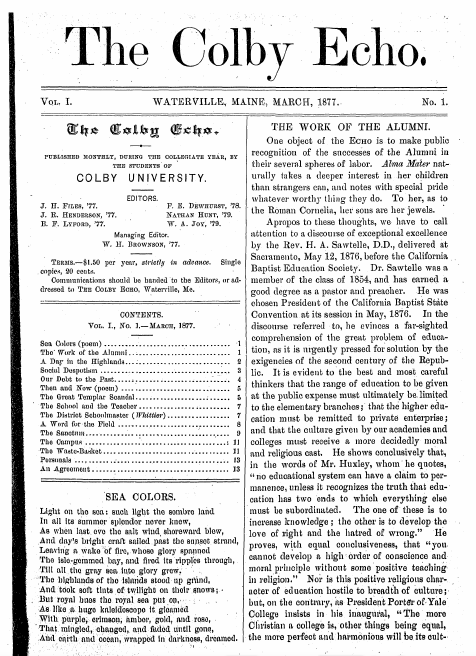
First Volume, First Issue of the Colby Echo

Colby's student newspaper, The Colby Echo, has been published since 1877. It was published monthly from 1877 to 1886, semi-monthly until 1898, and then weekly from 1898 on. Staff currently consists of 20 editors, who are responsible for assigning and writing articles, overseeing the production process and maintaining the Echo’s online presence. The Colby Echo editors also assign weekly articles to a team of 15 news staff writers. The Colby Echo is published every Wednesday that the college is in session, with 1,300 copies printed each week.

=== WMHB ===
WMHB 89.7 FM, is Colby's non-commercial College radio station, directed, managed, and staffed entirely by students. It has been on air since March 1949, and broadcasts new and diverse programming to Waterville, Winslow, Oakland, Fairfield and surrounding communities, and around the world on the Internet via its webcast.

== Sigma Kappa ==
Sigma Kappa (ΣΚ) is a sorority founded in 1874 at Colby College by five women: Mary Caffrey Low Carver, Elizabeth Gorham Hoag, Ida Mabel Fuller Pierce, Frances Elliott Mann Hall and Louise Helen Coburn. The sorority ceased to exist on Colby's campus in 1984 when the college changed its rules to disallow fraternities and sororities, citing a negative effect on the campus.
