= River Meetinghouse =

Historic church in Maine, United States

- U.S. National Register of Historic Places
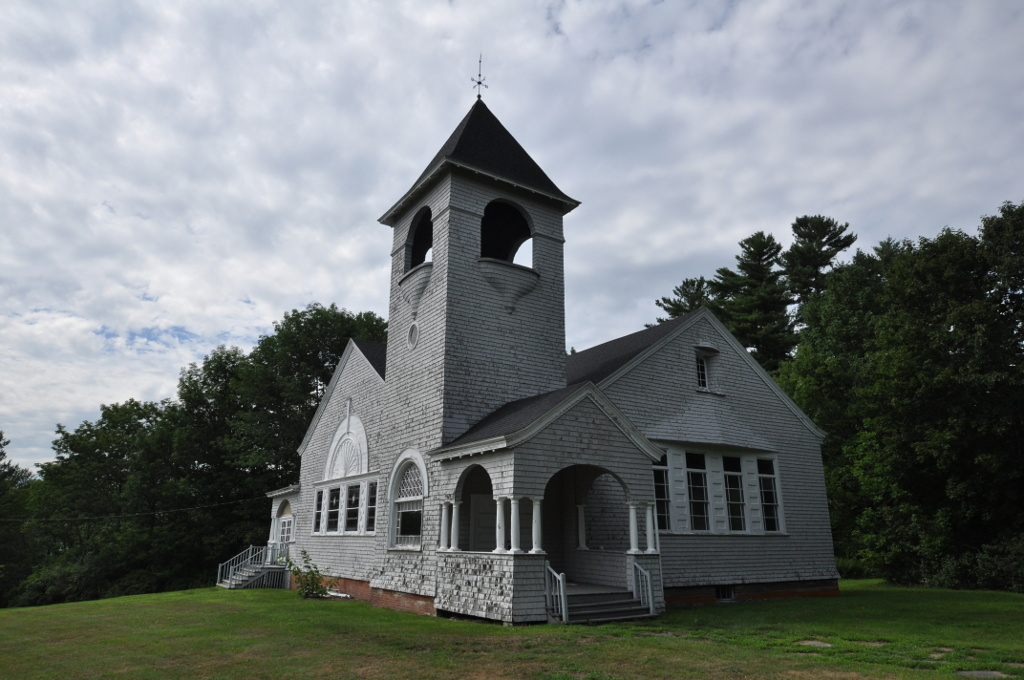

- Location within Maine Location within the United States
- Location: U.S. 201 at Oak Grove Rd., Vassalboro, Maine
- Coordinates: 44°28′3″N 69°40′30″W
- Area: 0.5 acres (0.20 ha)
- Built: 1786; restyled 1895
- Architect: Douglas, William H.
- Architectural style: Shingle Style
- NRHP reference No.: 77000073
- Added to NRHP: September 19, 1977

The Oak Grove Chapel, also known historically as the River Meetinghouse and the Sophia D. Bailey Chapel, is a non-denominational chapel at United States Route 201 and Oak Grove Road in Vassalboro, Maine. Built in 1786 as a Quaker meetinghouse, it was Vassalboro's first religious building. In 1895 it was restyled in the Shingle style, with a portico and tower added, and converted to non-denomination use by the Oak Grove-Coburn School (since closed). The building was listed on the National Register of Historic Places in 1977.

== Description and history ==
The Oak Grove Chapel stands in a rural area north of Vassalboro's village center, at the northeast corner of US 201 and Oak Grove Road. The campus of the Maine Criminal Justice Academy, formerly that of the Oak Grove-Coburn School, lies just east of, and across Oak Grove Road, from the chapel. It is a single-story short-legged T-shaped wood frame structure, with gabled roofs and a square tower rising from one of the T's corners. The exterior is almost entirely shingled, with rounded arches predominating as an architectural detail, from the main entrance portico on the right to the semicircular floral panel on the end of the T, and the secondary entrance to its left. The tower rises to an open belvedere with round-arch openings, and is topped by a pyramidal roof.

The area that became Vassalboro was settled in the 1770s by a group of Quakers from Nantucket. The core of the present chapel was built in 1786 to serve as their meetinghouse, and later became the site of quarterly regional meetings. To provide for the education of their children, the Quakers also established the Oak Grove School, which merged with Waterville's Coburn Classical Institute in 1970 and closed in 1989. With enrollment in the church declining, its meetinghouse was formally deeded to the school in 1895, which used it as a non-denominational chapel. It was at that time given extensive alteration, designed by William H. Douglas and funded by Sophia D. Bailey. During the school's ownership it was known as the Sophia D. Bailey Memorial Chapel.

== See also ==
- National Register of Historic Places listings in Kennebec County, Maine
