= Coburn Classical Institute =

American preprary school (1828–1970)

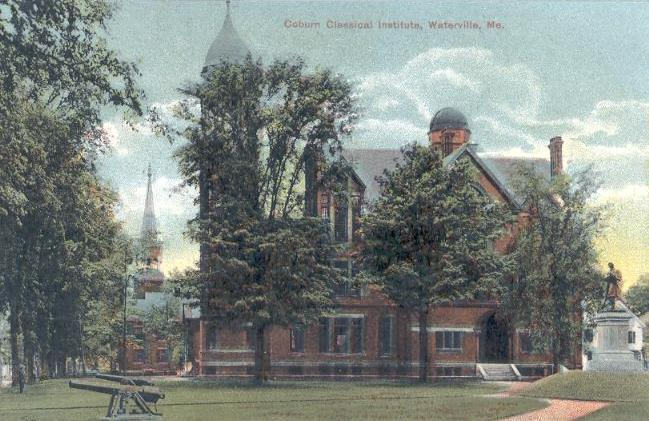

Location
- Waterville, Maine; United States
- Coordinates: 44°27′58″N 69°40′23″W

Information
- Former names: Waterville Academy; Waterville Classical Institute
- Funding type: Private
- Opened: 1828
- Closed: 1870

The Coburn Classical Institute was a college preparatory school in Waterville, Maine, which operated from 1828–1970.

== History ==
=== Waterville Academy ===
In its early years, Waterville College (now Colby College) had maintained a Latin school in the college buildings. Around 1828, the college trustees wanted a classical academy to prepare boys for entrance to the college. Land was donated by Hon. Timothy Boutelle, and funds raised by the college president Jeremiah Chaplin, for a small brick building in which the school went into operation in the fall of 1829. The school was under the charge of Henry W. Paine, then a member of the senior class at the college. Regarded as an appendage to the college, no act of incorporation was sought. There were 61 students in the school's first year.

For about two years, 1839 and 1840, Waterville Academy was closed. The school re-opened in 1841, and in 1842 the trustees of Waterville College incorporated the school separately and passed control to a new board of trustees. Girls were admitted to the school beginning in 1845.

=== Waterville Classical Institute ===
In 1865, the school was renamed the Waterville Classical Institute. In 1868, a Bachelor of Letters degree was first awarded to women. Around 1874, Abner Coburn pledged $50,000 to the endowment of the school, on the condition that $50,000 also be raised to support two other institutes proposed by the college (called at the time Colby University).

=== Coburn Classical Institute ===
In 1882, Coburn erected a new building for school at an additional expense of $38,000, and the school was renamed Coburn Classical Institute. An observatory dome was added to the school in 1889, with an Alvan Clark & Sons equatorial telescope.

In 1970, the school merged with the Oak Grove School in Vassalboro, Maine, which was renamed the Oak Grove Coburn School and closed in 1989. In 1990, the State of Maine purchased the Vassalboro campus and turned it into the State of Maine Criminal Justice Academy, a police academy which trains all law enforcement officers, state, county and municipal, who have the power of arrest and the authority to carry a firearm in the State of Maine.

== People ==
=== Principals ===
| Name | Term Began | Left/Retired | Reference |
|---|---|---|---|
| Henry W. Paine | 1828 | 1830 | |
| Robert W. Wood | 1830 | 1830 | |
| George I. Chace | 1830 | 1831 | |
| Henry Paine | 1831 | 1835 | |
| Charles H. Wheeler | 1841 | 1843 | |
| James H. Hanson | 1843 | 1894 | |
| Franklin W. Johnson | 1894 | 1905 | |
| George Stanley Stevenson | 1905 | 1912 | |
| Drew T. Harthorn | 1913 | ?? | |

=== Notable alumnae ===
- Louise Helen Coburn (1856–1949), 1873 A.B., one of the five founders of Sigma Kappa sorority and a pioneer for women's education at Colby College
- Obadiah Gardner (1852–1938), politician
- Ida Fuller (1858–1930), founder of Sigma Kappa sorority
- Asher Hinds (1863–1919), politician
- Edwin Francis Lyford (1857–1929), lawyer and politician
- Charles Francis Meserve (1850–1936), academic administrator and president of Shaw University; attended in the 1870s
- Marston Morse (1892–1977), mathematician
- Charles L. Phillips (1856–1937), U.S. Army brigadier general
- Jane Maria Read (1853–?), poet and teacher
- C. Donald Stritch (1931–2014), politician
- Clyde Sukeforth (1901–2000), enrolled 1916, major and minor league baseball player, manager and scout.

=== Notable faculty ===
- Elijah Parish Lovejoy (1824–1826), headmaster
- Ginger Fraser (1919–1921), athletic director
