= Doyon =

Doyon may refer to:

- Christopher Doyon (born 1964), American hacktivist
- Cyrille Doyon (1842–1918), Quebec merchant, farmer and political figure
- Marie-Claude Doyon (born 1965), Canadian luger who competed in the late 1980s
- Mario Doyon (born 1968), retired Canadian ice hockey defenceman
- Pierre Adolphe Adrien Doyon (1827–1907), French dermatologist and balneologist born in Grenoble
- Stephanie Doyon (born Maine), an American novelist best known for her award-winning novel, The Greatest Man in Cedar Hole

== See also ==
- Doyon, North Dakota, an unincorporated community
- Doyon, is a hamlet in the province of Namur (Belgium)
- Doyon, Limited, one of thirteen Alaska Native Regional Corporations created under the Alaska Native Claims Settlement Act of 1971 (ANCSA) in settlement of aboriginal land claims
