= Sigma Delta =

Social sorority at Dartmouth College, US

- ΣΔ
- Founded: 1988; 38 years ago Dartmouth College
- Type: Social
- Affiliation: Independent
- Former affiliation: Sigma Kappa (1977-1988)
- Status: Active
- Scope: Local
- Pillars: Strength, Friendship, and Acceptance of Difference
- Symbol: Snake
- Chapters: 1
- Members: 174 lifetime
- Headquarters: 10 West Wheelock Street; Hanover, New Hampshire 03755; United States; 43.70216°N 72.29116°W

Sigma Delta (ΣΔ) is a local collegiate sorority at Dartmouth College in Hanover, New Hampshire in the United States. It was established in 1988 when it withdrew from the North American social sorority Sigma Kappa.

== History ==
Sigma Delta was founded in May 1977 at Dartmouth College as the Zeta Lambda chapter of Sigma Kappa national sorority. It was the first sorority to be founded on Dartmouth's campus. Women were not permitted to enroll at Dartmouth until 1972; the sorority provided a place where the college's coed students could meet.

By the late 1980s, Dartmouth's student population had diversified and the Sigma Kappa chapter experienced an influx of minority women who wished to have not only a female space, but also a space that would embrace their personal identities as women regardless of age, class, religion, or ethnicity. In the fall of 1988, Dartmouth's Sigma Kappa chapter split from the national organization and became a local sorority. Its members made this decision to move away from "the patriarchal, puritanical and heteronormative conventions ingrained in sororities affiliated with national chapters". In addition, they felt that the national sorority's rituals were too heavily steeped in religion.

The sorority changed its name to Sigma Delta and was established as Dartmouth's first local sorority. It is not affiliated with the National Panhellenic Conference. As of 2025, Sigma Delta has initiated 174 members.

== Symbols ==
The sorority's symbol is the snake. Its philosophy or pillars are strength, friendship, and acceptance of difference.

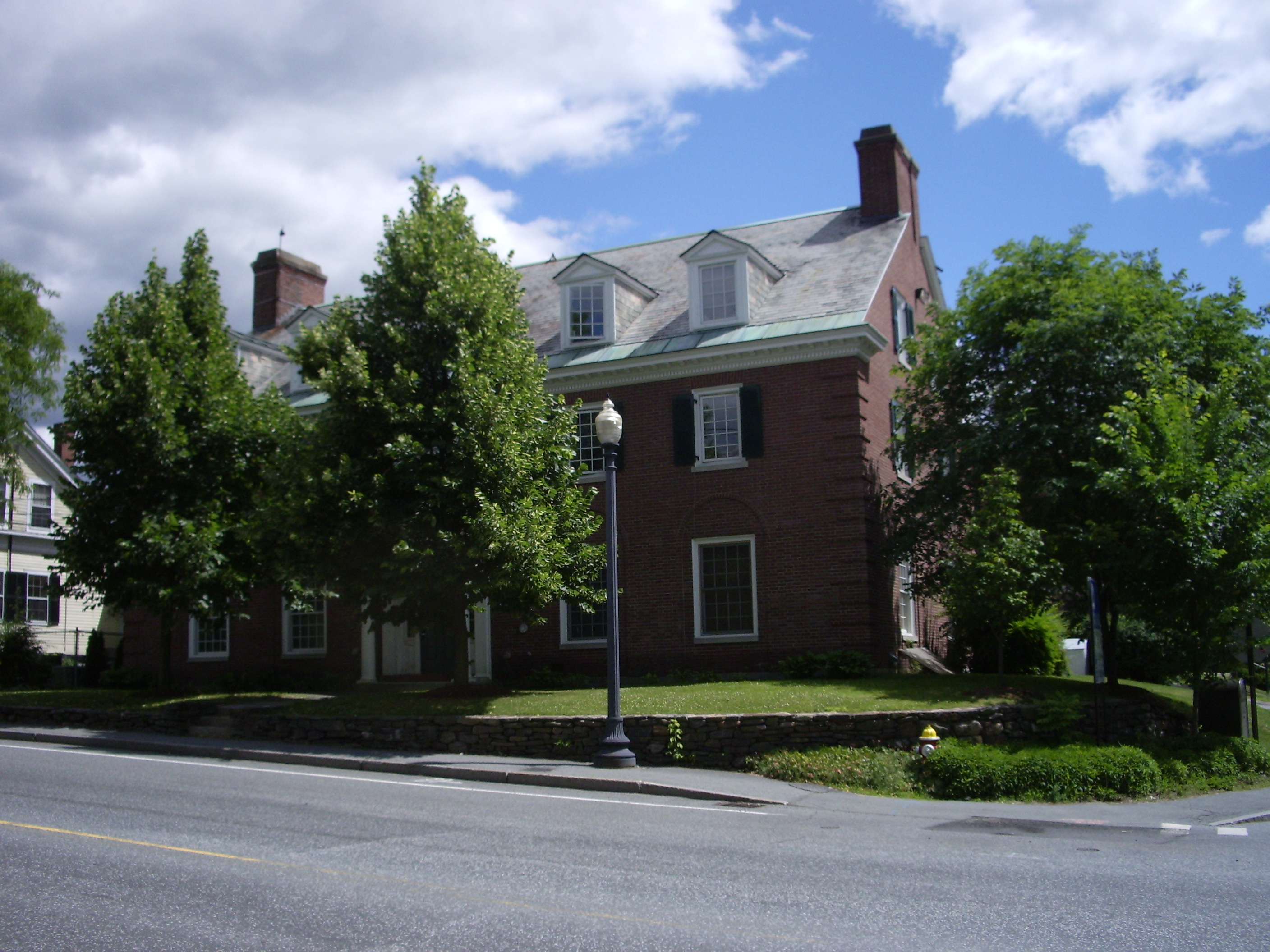
Sigma Delta house, 2007

== Chapter house ==
The Sigma Delta chapter house is located at 10 Westlock Street in Hanover, New Hampshire. The house is owned by Dartmouth College.

== Membership ==
Sigma Delta's membership is open to all students who identify as female, are gender nonconforming, and are nonbinary.

== Notable alumni ==
- Connie Britton - actress
- Jasmine Drolet - Olympic skier
- Michaela Hesová - Olympic ice hockey player
- Mindy Kaling - writer and actress

== Controversies ==
In September 2010, Sigma Delta was charged with three counts of serving alcohol to minors during three incidents in the spring and fall of 2010.

In 2015, Dartmouth's sororities decided to ban alcohol. However, Sigma Delta was able to reject this decision because it is an independent sorority and not a part of the National Panhellenic Council.

== See also ==
- Dartmouth College fraternities and sororities
- List of social sororities and women's fraternities
- Cultural interest fraternities and sororities
