= Charles Francis Meserve =

American academic administrator (1850–1936)

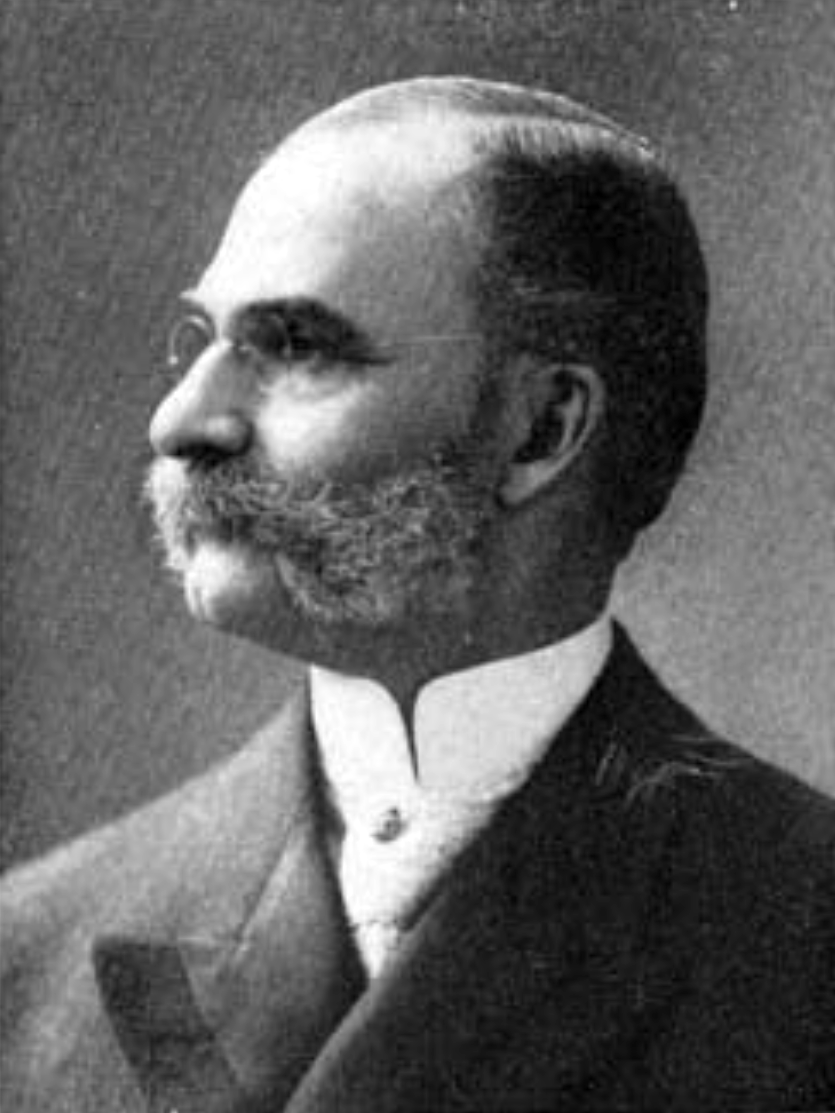

3rd President of Shaw University
- In office 1894–1919
- Preceded by: Nicholas Franklin Roberts
- Succeeded by: Joseph Leishman Peacock

Personal details
- Born: July 15, 1850 Abington, Massachusetts, U.S.
- Died: April 20, 1935 (aged 84) Raleigh, North Carolina, U.S.
- Resting place: Pine Grove Cemetery, Waterville, Maine, U.S.
- Spouse(s): Abbie Mary Whittier, Fannie J. Philbrick
- Education: Colby College
- Occupation: Educator, university president, academic administrator, author

Charles Francis Meserve (1850–1936) was an American educator, university president, academic administrator, and author. He served as president of Shaw University from 1894 to 1919, a historically Black university in Raleigh, North Carolina.

== Early life and education ==
Charles Francis Meserve was born on July 15, 1850, in Abington, Massachusetts. His parents were Susan Smith Blanchard and Charles Meserve, a shoemaker and farmer. His family was descendants of Clement Meserve, a native from the Isle of Jersey (now Jersey) who emigrated to the United States in 1673. Meserve attended Waterville Classical Institute (later known as Coburn Classical Institute) for three years.

In 1873, he enrolled in Colby College; where he graduated with an A.B. degree in 1877; an A.M. degree in 1880; and a LL.D. degree in 1899.

== Career ==
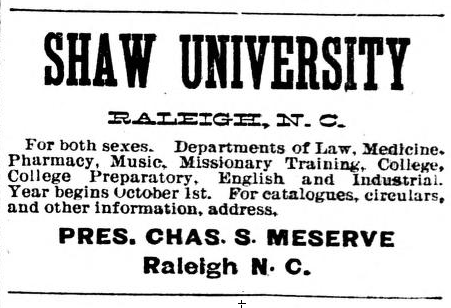
Advertising for the school in 1900

After graduation Meserve worked as principal of the high school in Rockland, Massachusetts (1877 to 1885), and at the Oak Street School in Springfield, Massachusetts (1885 to 1889). This was followed by a role as superintendent of the Haskell Institute (now Haskell Indian Nations University) in Lawrence, Kansas (1889 to 1894).

From 1894 until 1919, Meserve served as president of Shaw University. Under his leadership Shaw University improved the curriculum, and increased the size of the industrial department.

He was a Baptist and was licensed to preach at a specific church, the First Baptist Church in Raleigh, but he was not ordained. Merserve helped found the Capon Springs Conference (later known as the Conference on Education for the South) in Capon Springs, West Virginia. He also gave lectures on "Indian and negro problems".

== Death and archives ==
He died on April 20, 1935, in Raleigh, North Carolina. He is buried at Pine Grove Cemetery in Waterville, Maine.

The National Archives and Records Administration contains a 1897 letter from Meserve to Daniel M. Browning concerning the recent punishment of Richard Henry Pratt. The W. E. B. Du Bois Papers at the University of Massachusetts Amherst library contains a 1908 letter from Meserve to Du Bois. The American Baptist Historical Society Repository contains his papers.

== Personal life ==
He was married to Abbie Mary Whittier from 1878 until her death in 1898; together they had one daughter. In 1900, Merserve married Fannie J. Philbrick.

Merserve was a member of the Republican Party.

== Writings ==
- Meserve, Charles Francis (1894). A Tour of Observation Among Indians and Indian Schools; In Arizona, New Mexico, Oklahoma and Kansas. Office of the Indian Rights Association.
- Meserve, Charles Francis (1896). The Dawes Commission and the Five Civilized Tribes of Indian Territory. Five Civilized Tribes Commission. Office of the Indian Rights Association.
- Meserve, Charles Francis (1928). Shell Heaps at Damariscotta. Bath Daily Times.
- Meserve, Charles Francis (1930). Abington's Part in the Building of a Great Commonwealth and a Powerful Nation. Squirrel Island, Maine.
