= First Baptist Church (Raleigh, North Carolina) =

Baptist church in Raleigh, North Carolina, US

First Baptist Church of Raleigh
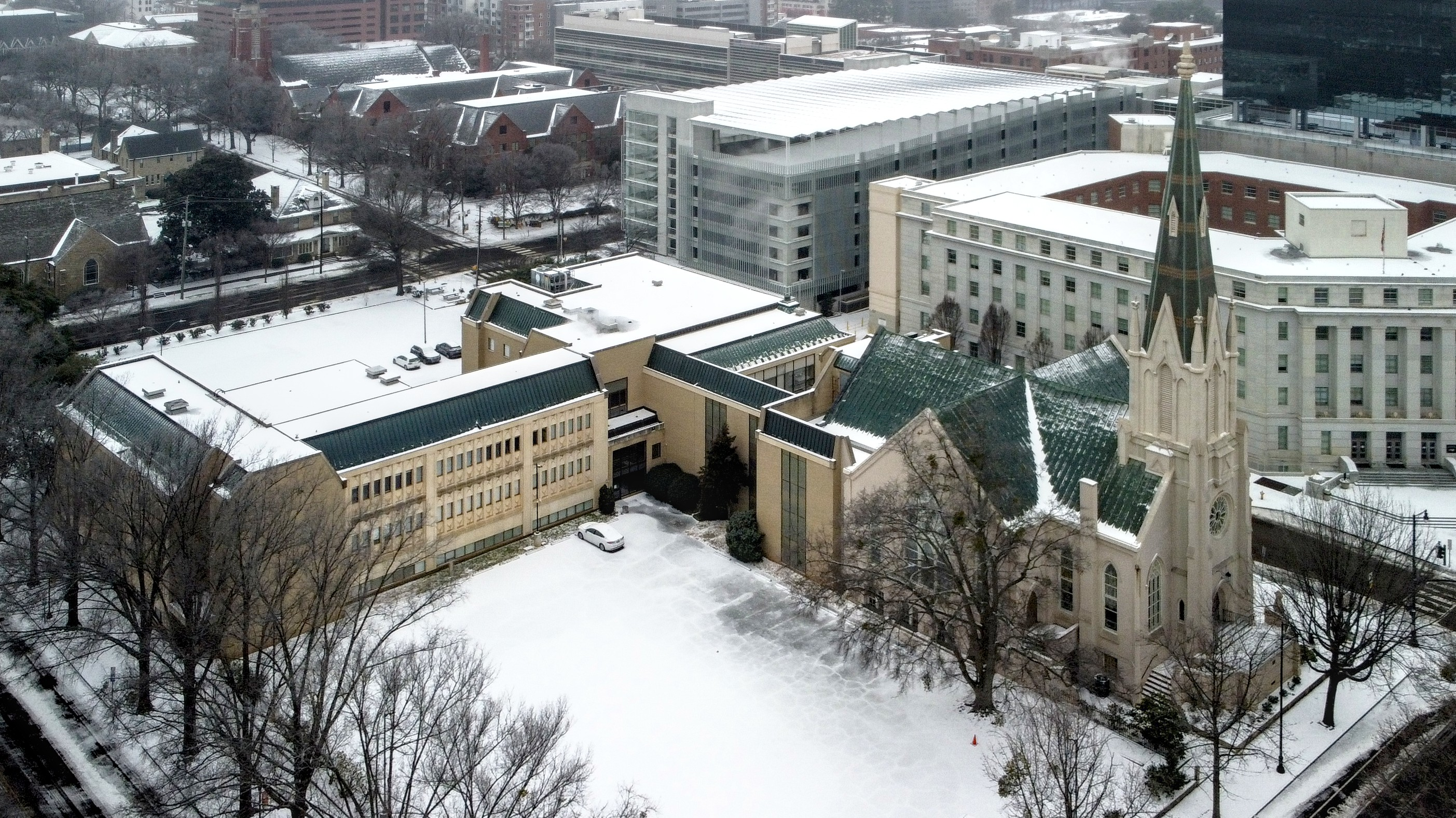
- First Baptist Church of Raleigh building as seen during the January 2026 Ice Storm

Religion
- Affiliation: Cooperative Baptist Fellowship (CBF)
- District: CBFNC
- Ecclesiastical or organizational status: Organized 1812
- Status: Active

Location
- Location: 99 N. Salibury Street, Raleigh, North Carolina, 27603
- State: North Carolina
- Interactive map of First Baptist Church of Raleigh

Architecture
- Completed: 1859

First Baptist Church of Raleigh is located in downtown Raleigh, North Carolina. The church was the first Baptist church in the city of Raleigh, organized in 1812, and is one of the oldest churches in the area. The church is located on 99 North Salisbury Street, directly across the street from the North Carolina State Capitol. First Baptist Church is affiliated with the Cooperative Baptist Fellowship (CBF).

The Church began in 1812 with 23 members, 14 of whom were "black slaves." By 1826 there were 157 black members, and 77 white members. In 1866 the 200 black members organized a church of their own, while the 226 white members stayed at First Baptist.

Charles Francis Meserve, was a member of the church and was licensed to preach at this location, despite not being ordained.
