= Governor Morrill =

Governor Morrill may refer to:

- Anson Morrill (1803–1887), 24th Governor of Maine
- Edmund Needham Morrill (1834–1909), 13th Governor of Kansas
- Lot M. Morrill (1813–1883), 28th Governor of Maine
- David L. Morril (1772–1849), 10th Governor of New Hampshire
