= Jane Maria Read =

American poet

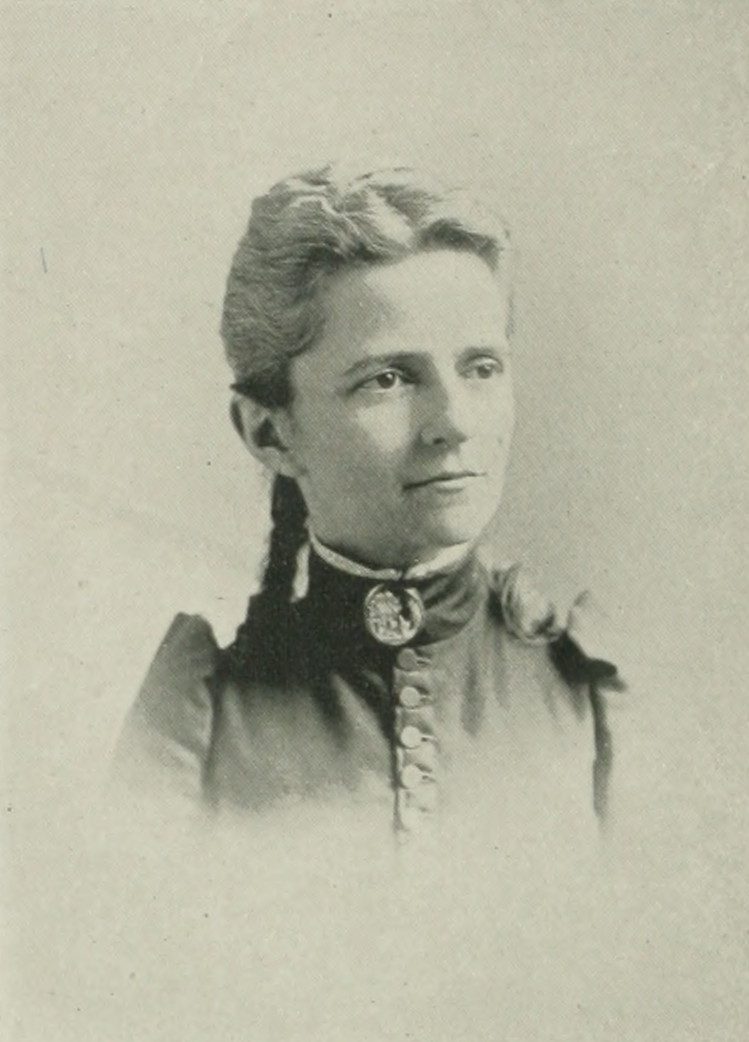
- Photo in A Woman of the Century
- Born: October 4, 1853; Barnstable, Massachusetts, U.S.
- Died: August 15, 1921 (aged 67); Muskogee, Oklahoma, U.S.
- Education: Coburn Classical Institute
- Occupations: poet; teacher
- Writing career
- Language: English
- Genre: poetry

Jane Maria Read (October 4, 1853 – August 15, 1921) was an American poet and teacher from Massachusetts. A descendant of early colonial families, she was educated in private schools and by classical teachers, though compelled by ill health to leave before graduating. Read began publishing her poetry in 1874 in various magazines and newspapers, and a volume of her verse, Between the Centuries, and Other Poems, was published in 1887. In addition to her literary work, she was a talented artist and taught languages, mathematics, as well as drawing, painting and sketching.

== Early life and education ==
Jane Maria Read was born in Barnstable, Massachusetts, October 4, 1853. She was the daughter of William and Susan Maritta (Austin) Read. Her father, Rev. Read, was a Baptist clergyman. She came from old colonial families on both sides, and her ancestors were among the early English pioneers. Until six years of age, her home was in Massachusetts. In 1859, her parents moved to the seacoast of Maine, where they lived till 1865, at that time returning to Massachusetts.

Her literary taste began early to be developed in her home, where she was wont to listen absorbed to the reading of history, travels, and The Poetical Works Of Sir Walter Scott, when too young to enjoy reading them alone. During her school life, and subsequently, her love of poetry increased year by year. She studied at Newell's Private School, Wilbraham, Massachusetts; Burnett's English Classical Institute, Springfield, Waterville, Maine; and in the Coburn Classical Institute, in Waterville, Maine, for several years, though ill health compelled her to leave during the last year of her course, without graduating. Her classical instruction included art under Childe Hassam, John Joseph Enneking, Emil Carlsen, and others.

== Career ==
Read began to publish her poems in 1874, in various magazines and newspapers, and in 1887, she published a volume of verse entitled Between the Centuries, and Other Poems. She contributed, among others, to the Magazine of Poetry. Besides her poetical work, she was an artist of marked talent, and made a specialty of portraits and animal pictures in oil colors.

She taught languages, mathematics and other branches until about 1885. She also taught drawing, painting and sketching from nature in various towns of Massachusetts for fifteen years.

== Personal life ==
Read was a Baptist, and a woman of broad views, liberal culture and versatility. Her home was in Coldbrook Springs, Massachusetts, where her father was in charge of a church. Later, she resided in Still River, Massachusetts.

At the end of her life, she resided in Muskogee, Oklahoma, at the home of her nephew Mason Read and his family. She died there on August 15, 1921, after a prolonged illness.

== Style and themes ==
Much of Read's poetry was of the introspective kind, with a strong element of the religious and the sentimental. Having been presented with a copy of Henry Wadsworth Longfellow's poems, for months, it was her constant companion, the more so because the state of her health prevented her from mingling with others outside of her home. Many of the poems she read and re-read until she could easily repeat them, and all became quite familiar. This she accepted as a great truth, and in her writing, Read looked within her own heart for the lessons reflected there from nature. A close and sympathetic observer of nature, almost every phase of it had a voice for her. Brought up in a family where she was forced to see the burdens of others, she also wrote for "burden-bearers", and sought to show the brighter side to those whose lives had difficulties. Thus, many of her poems were included the calmness of her own Christian faith.

== Selected works ==
- Between the centuries and other poems, 1887
