= Stephen Coburn =

American politician

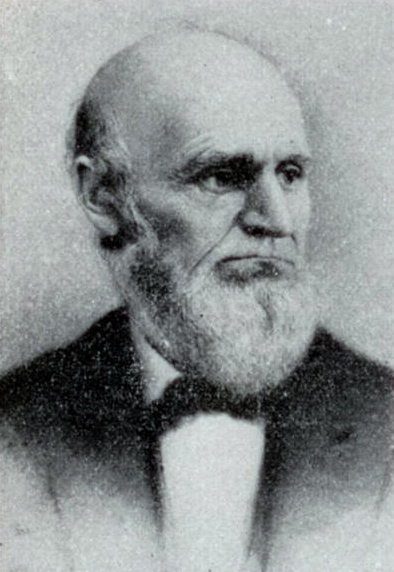

Member of the U.S. House of Representatives from Maine's 5th district
- In office January 2, 1861 – March 3, 1861
- Preceded by: Israel Washburn, Jr.
- Succeeded by: John H. Rice

Personal details
- Born: November 11, 1817 Bloomfield, Massachusetts (now Skowhegan, Maine)
- Died: July 4, 1882 (aged 64) Skowhegan, Maine
- Resting place: South Cemetery in Skowhegan, Maine
- Party: Republican
- Spouse: Helen Sophia Miller
- Relations: Abner Coburn (brother),
- Children: Louise Helen Coburn, Charles Miller, Susy Mary, Frances Elizabeth, Grace Maud
- Education: Colby College; Harvard Law School
- Profession: Lawyer

Stephen Coburn (November 11, 1817 – July 4, 1882) was a Republican member of the United States House of Representatives from Maine.

He was brother to Maine Governor Abner Coburn and the father of Louise Helen Coburn, the founder of Sigma Kappa sorority and a prominent Maine writer.

Coburn was born in Bloomfield, Massachusetts, now known as Skowhegan. He graduated from Colby College in Waterville in 1839 and after teaching at a plantation school for two years, he attended Harvard Law School and became a prominent lawyer in his native state.

He was elected to the 36th Congress in a special election on November 6, 1860, and served from January 2 to March 3, 1861. The election for the 37th Congress had actually been held in September of the previous year, so he could not be re-elected. Coburn served as a delegate from Maine to the peace convention in 1861 in Washington, D.C.

Coburn resumed his law practice, eventually becoming postmaster of Skowhegan. He drowned in the Kennebec River at Skowhegan in 1882. He is interred in South Cemetery in Skowhegan.

U.S. House of Representatives
Preceded by Israel Washburn, Jr.	Member of the U.S. House of Representatives from Maine's 5th congressional district 1861	Succeeded by John H. Rice
