= Ed Phillips (pitcher) =

American baseball player (1944–2017)

- Relief pitcher
- Born: September 20, 1944; Ardmore, Oklahoma, U.S.
- Died: September 20, 2017 (aged 73); Wells, Maine, U.S.
- Batted: Right Threw: Right

MLB debut
- April 9, 1970, for the Boston Red Sox

Last MLB appearance
- August 29, 1970, for the Boston Red Sox

MLB statistics
- Games played: 18
- Win–loss record: 0–2
- Earned run average: 5.32
- Strikeouts: 23
- Innings pitched: 23 2/3
- Stats at Baseball Reference

Teams
- Boston Red Sox (1970)

Norman Edwin Phillips (September 20, 1944 – September 20, 2017) was an American middle relief pitcher in Major League Baseball who played briefly for the Boston Red Sox during the 1970 season.

Listed at 6 feet 1 inch (1.85 m) tall and 190 pounds (86 kg), Phillips batted and threw right-handed. The Ardmore, Oklahoma, native grew up in Portland, Maine, where he graduated from Deering High School. He attended Colby College, and in 1963 he played collegiate summer baseball for Chatham of the Cape Cod Baseball League. He was selected by the Red Sox in the 16th round of the 1966 MLB draft.

In 18 relief appearances with Boston, Phillips posted a 0–2 record with a 5.32 ERA without a save, giving up 14 runs on 29 hits and 10 walks while striking out 23 in 23 2/3 innings of work.

He died of cancer on his 73rd birthday, September 20, 2017.

== See also ==
- 1970 Boston Red Sox season
- Boston Red Sox all-time roster
- List of Colby College people
