= List of Colby College faculty =

Jeremiah Chaplin, the founder and first president of the college

This list of Colby College faculty includes current and former instructors and administrators of Colby College in Waterville, Maine, as well as a list of the endowed faculty positions. As of 2025, Colby has 247 instructional employees.

== Humanities and social sciences ==
Name	Position(s)	Joined college	Left/retired	Alumnus/na?	Reference
Neil Gross	Charles A. Dana Professor of Sociology and chair of the department of sociology	2015	active	no	
Aaron R. Hanlon	NEH/Class of 1940 Distinguished Associate Professor of the Humanities	2015	active	no	
Tanya Sheehan	Ellerton M. and Edith K. Jetté Professor of Art, chair of the Department of STS, and chair of the Humanities Division	2013	active	no	
Jennifer Yoder	Robert Diamond Professor of Humanities	1996	active	no	
Catherine L. Besteman	Francis F. Bartlett and Ruth K. Bartlett Professor of Anthropology	1994	active	no	
Debra Barbezat	Mitchell Family Professor of Economics	1992	active	no	
Sarah Willie-LeBreton	Assistant professor, African American Studies/Sociology/Women's Studies	1991	1995	no	
Kenneth A. Rodman	William R. Cotter Distinguished Teaching Professor of Government	1989	active	no	
James Rodger Fleming	Visiting assistant to Charles A. Dana Professor of STS	1988	2021	no	
Randy A. Nelson	Douglas Professor of Economics and Finance	1987	active	no	
Cheryl Townsend Gilkes	John D. and Catherine T. MacArthur Professor of Sociology and African-American Studies	1987	2022	no	
Patrice M. Franko	Grossman Professor of Economics	1986	active	no	
G. Calvin Mackenzie	Goldfarb Family Distinguished Professor of American Government	1985	active	no	
David W. Findlay	Pugh Family Professor of Economics	1985	active	no	
James W. Meehan	Herbert E. Wadsworth Professor of Economics	1973	Emeritus	no	
L. Sandy Maisel	William R. Kenan, Jr. Professor of Government	1971	2021	no	
Thomas J. Morrione	Charles A. Dana Professor of Sociology	1971	active	1965	
Jack D. Foner	History	1969	1976	no	
Albion Woodbury Small	Professor of political economy	1881	1888	1876	

== Natural sciences ==
Name	Position(s)	Joined college	Left/retired	Alumnus/na?	Reference
Andrea R. Tilden	J. Warren Merrill Professor of Chemistry and Natural History		active	no	
Fernando Q. Gouvêa	Carter Professor of Mathematics		active	no	
D. Whitney King	Frank and Theodora Miselis Professor of Chemistry	1989	active	no	
W. Herbert Wilson	Leslie Brainerd Arey Professor of Biosciences	1990	2018	no	
F. Russell Cole	Oak Professor of Biological Sciences		2016	no	
Robert A. Gastaldo	Whipple-Coddington Professor of Geology	1999	2020	no	
Julie T. Millard	Dr. Gerald and Myra Dorros Professor of Chemistry		active	no	
Charles Conover	William A. Rogers Professor in Physics		active	no	
Robert T. Bluhm, Jr.	Sunrise Professor of Physics		active	no	
Allen B. Downey	Assistant professor of computer science	1997	2000	no	
Gordon Enoch Gates	Professor of biology	1948	1950	1919	
Keith Devlin	Carter Professor of Mathematics and chair of Department of Math & Computer Science	1989	1993	no	
William T. Bovie	Lecturer in science	1939	1949	no	
Rutherford John Gettens	Instructor in chemistry	1923	1927	no	
Marshman Edward Wadsworth	Professor of mineralogy and geology	1885	1886	no	
Theophilus C. Abbot	Instructor in chemistry, history, Greek, and Latin	1845	1852	1853	
Justin Rolph Loomis	Professor of chemistry and natural history		1838	no	

== Athletics ==
Name	Position(s)	Joined college	Left/retired	Alumnus/na?	Reference
Blaise MacDonald	Men's ice hockey coach	2012	active	no	
Lori Gear McBride	Women's basketball coach	2004	2010	no	
Timothy Wheaton	Harold Alfond Director of Athletics	2015	2017	no	
Laura Halldorson	Women's ice hockey coach	1989	1986	no	
James Wescott	Men's track and cross-country coach	1978	2003	no	
Jack Kelley	Men's ice hockey coach	1976	1977	no	
John Winkin	Men's baseball coach, director of athletics	1954	1974	no	
Lee Williams	Men's basketball coach	1946	1965	no	
Bill Millett	Coach, "Mr. Colby"	1929	1948	1929	
Harold McDevitt	Men's baseball coach, director of athletics	1909	1910	no	

== Other ==
Name	Position(s)	Joined college	Left/retired	Alumnus/na?	Reference
Sharon L. Corwin	Carolyn Muzzy Director of the Colby College Museum of Art and chief curator	2006	active	no	
Robert B. Downs	Librarian	1929	1931	no	
Peyton R. Helm	Vice president for college relations	1988	2003	no	
Ninetta May Runnals	Dean of women, professor of mathematics and education	1920	1949	yes	
