= John H. Rice =

American politician (1816-1911)

John Hovey Rice
- Congressman Rice in 1865

Member of the U.S. House of Representatives from Maine
- In office March 4, 1861 – March 3, 1867
- Preceded by: Stephen Coburn (5th); Anson Morrill (4th)
- Succeeded by: Frederick A. Pike (5th); John A. Peters (4th)
- Constituency: 5th district (1861-63); 4th district (1863-67)

Personal details
- Born: February 5, 1816 Mount Vernon, Massachusetts (now Maine), US
- Died: March 14, 1911 (aged 95) Chicago, Illinois, US
- Resting place: Oak Woods Cemetery
- Party: Republican
- Spouse: Grace Elizabeth (Burleigh) Rice (m. 1847)
- Children: Frank Willis Rice (b. 1849); Anna Frances Rice (b. 1850); Mary A. Rice (b. 1855)

John Hovey Rice (February 5, 1816 – March 14, 1911) was a U.S. representative from Maine.

== Biography ==
Rice's grave at Oak Woods Cemetery

Born in Mount Vernon, Massachusetts (now in Maine), to Nathaniel and Mary Jane (Swazey) Rice, Rice attended the common schools. He served as clerk in the office of the register of deeds, Augusta, Maine from 1831 to 1841. He engaged in the mercantile business. Deputy sheriff. He served as aide-de-camp to General Bachelor in the Aroostook War, the northeastern boundary dispute with Great Britain, in 1838. He moved to Piscataquis County, Maine, in 1843. He studied law. He was admitted to the bar and commenced practice in Piscataquis County in 1848. He served as prosecuting attorney for Piscataquis County 1852–1860. He served as delegate to the Republican National Convention in 1856.

Rice was elected as a Republican to the Thirty-seventh, Thirty-eighth, and Thirty-ninth Congresses (March 4, 1861 – March 3, 1867). He served as chairman of the Committee on Public Buildings and Grounds (Thirty-eighth and Thirty-ninth Congresses). He declined to be a candidate for renomination. United States collector of customs at the port of Bangor, Maine from 1861 to 1871. He moved to Washington, D.C., where he practiced law for twelve years. Thence to New York City in 1884 and practiced until 1899. He moved to Chicago, Illinois, in May 1899 and remained there until his death on March 14, 1911. He was interred in Oak Woods Cemetery.

U.S. House of Representatives
Preceded by Stephen Coburn	Member of the U.S. House of Representatives from Maine's 5th congressional district March 4, 1861 – March 3, 1863	Succeeded by Frederick A. Pike
Preceded by Anson P. Morrill	Member of the U.S. House of Representatives from Maine's 4th congressional district March 4, 1863 – March 3, 1867	Succeeded by John A. Peters
