= Jerrold Lee Shapiro =

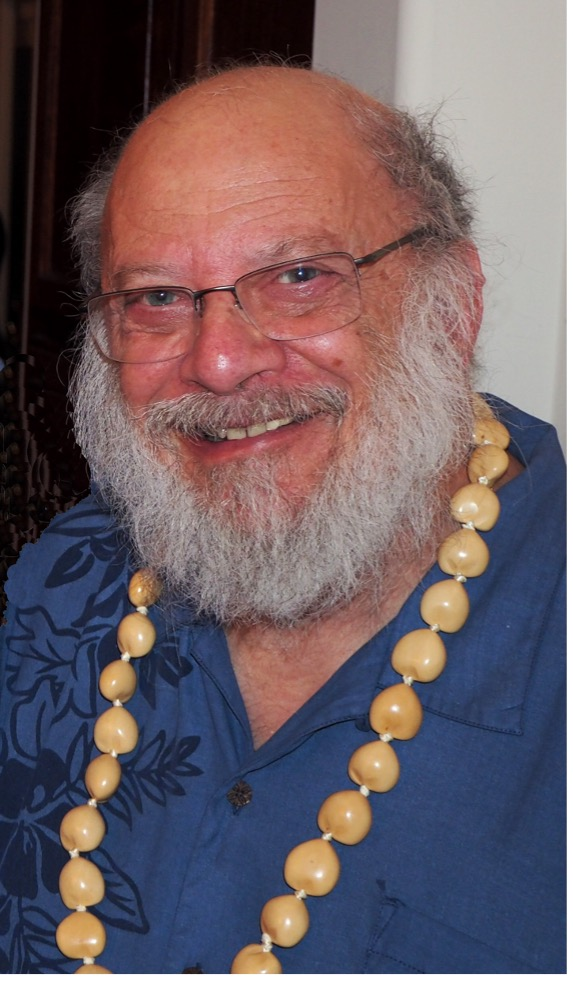
- Jerrold Lee Shapiro
- Born: January 15, 1943 (age 83)
- Education: Colby College; Northwestern University; University of Waterloo
- Occupations: Clinical psychologist, author, educator
- Known for: Clinical psychology, group psychotherapy, fatherhood research

Jerrold Lee Shapiro is an American clinical psychologist and professor in the Santa Clara University Counseling Psychology graduate program. He is a licensed clinical psychologist (HI, 1974; CA, 1978) and a Fellow of the American Psychological Association.

== Education and academic career ==
Shapiro is a graduate of Boston Latin School (1960), Colby College (A.B., 1964), Northwestern University (M.A., 1967) and The University of Waterloo (Ph.D., Clinical Psychology, 1970). He held internships at the VA Outpatient Clinic in Boston, MA, Downey VA Hospital (IL) Hawaii State Hospital (Kaneohe, HI) and Hamilton (Ontario) Psychiatric Hospital.

He has been a professor at Santa Clara University (1982–present) in the graduate department of Counseling Psychology, also serving as the chairman of the graduate program (2001-2007; 2012–2013). Dr. Shapiro was director of Santa Clara University's College of Professional Development from 2002 to 2014. Prior to his professorship at Santa Clara University, Shapiro was a professor at St. Bonaventure University (1969-1970), The University of Hawaii (1970-1982; Dept. Chair 1971–1973), visiting professor at UC Santa Cruz (1978–79), and a myriad of clinical psychology and family therapy programs.

He has served on editorial boards of professional journals (PsycCritiques; Family Therapy) and as an ad hoc reviewer for several journals and book publishers.

== Career ==
Shapiro was first licensed in Hawaii in 1974 and later in California in 1978. During his career, he has held advanced certifications: A Diplomate from the American Board of Medical Psychotherapists (ABMP, 1987–2010), a Certified Clinical Consultant by American Society of Clinical Hypnosis (1994-2006), certified by the National Registry of Certified Group Therapists (1997-2006), and listed in the National Register of Health Care Providers in Psychology (1978–2019).

From 1970 until 2020, Shapiro was engaged in the part-time practice of individual, group, couple and family psychotherapy. He was a partner in the King Kalakaua Center for Humanistic Psychotherapy in Honolulu from 1974 to 1982, a member of Spectrum Comprehensive Mental Health, and partner in a private practice in Los Altos, CA. He was also a visiting staff counselor at the Counseling Center (Crown & Kresge Colleges), University of California, Santa Cruz 1978–1979.

He was founding/managing partner of Family Business Solutions, a consulting firm that specialized in Family Business. In particular, the consultation is designed to help family and closely held businesses through transitions.

Among his consultations are several with the U.S. Air Force in the Pacific, U.S. Army (Hawaii) and Navy (Pearl Harbor). These have been primarily focused on Command Communications Equal Opportunities, Race Relations, family life and combat veterans' needs.

From 1994 to 2001, Shapiro was president of PsyJourn, a psychotherapy-oriented software company. The company produced homework modules for patients to use between psychotherapy sessions. The modules were successfully clinically tested and shown to enhance the effectiveness of group therapy in the treatment of veterans with post-traumatic stress disorder and for training future clinicians at Santa Clara University.

== Awards and honors ==
- Named "notable alumnus" Boston Latin School for graduation year 1960
- Manfred Guttmacher Award (1991). Highest honor for literature granted by the American Psychiatric Association for Trance on Trial (1989, The Guilford Press).
- Winner of a 1995 "Book of the Year" award for Becoming a Father (Springer, 1995) from the American Journal of Nursing
- Award for Sustained Excellence in Scholarship, from Santa Clara University (2006)
- His book, Finding Meaning, Facing Fears in the Autumn of Your Years (45-65) an Alpha Sigma Nu (National Jesuit Honors Society) Book of the year 2013-2014.
- Shapiro won the Santa Clara University Faculty Senate "Professor of the Year" Award for the 2016-2017 Academic Year. It is the university's highest honor for Teaching, Research and Service.
- He has been elected "Fellow" of the American Psychological Association (2008-2019) in four divisions (Family Psychology, Group Psychology, Independent Practice and Media)
- In 2020, the American Psychological Association Division 49 (Group Psychology) awarded him its Teacher of the Year Award, presented August 6, 2020.
- In December, 2025, Shapiro was honored by the American Psychological Association, Division 29 (Psychotherapy) with a "Who's Who in Psychotherapy" video interview.

== Research ==
Shapiro's research has ranged from a lengthy series of empirical studies on the outcome effectiveness of group therapy, and interview-based studies of fatherhood, psychotherapist training, couple therapy, and the life transition after midlife. A number of journal, book publications, book chapters, and presentations at professional meetings in each area have ensued.

Based on the pioneering empirical effectiveness research on brief closed groups in the 1970s, he developed a vertically integrated group leader training program. The model program was instituted at the University of Hawaii (1972) and subsequently at Santa Clara University (1982), where it continues. The training involves separate classes in group theory and practice, membership in a training group, advanced class in group leadership, co-leadership of a training group with an experienced professional and finally senior leadership after licensure.

Shapiro's other signature work was a two-decade study of the male experience of fatherhood. These interview and clinically informed studies ranged from expectant fathering (When She’s Pregnant: The Essential Guide for Expectant Fathers, When Men are Pregnant: Needs and Concerns of Expectant Fathers, Becoming a Father: Contemporary Social, Developmental and Clinical Perspectives) to lifelong fatherhood and father-child interactions (The Measure of a Man: Becoming the Father You Wish Your Father Had Been) Most importantly, the work underscores the psychological influence of a man's relationship with his own father (or significant male figures) to the manner in which he subsequently approaches his children. His fatherhood work was part of a renewed interest in men and fatherhood that emerged in the 1980s and 1990s and is finding continuing exploration in the 21st century. Until this time, during most of the Twentieth Century, parenting and research was almost exclusively focused on motherhood.

== Publications ==
Shapiro has authored and edited 20 books many of which have been published in numerous languages, and contributed chapters to several others, His book publications include:

- Shapiro, J.L, Wei, N.Z Sethu, D., Gazit, K. & Scott, T. G. (2025) Couple Therapy Through the Lens of Four Asian Cultures: Working with Clients from Collectivistic Cultures Living in North America. Cognella Academic Publishers.
- Shapiro, J.L. (2022) An Acquired Taste: Lifelong Optimism, Skepticism and Darn Good Luck. Xlibris Publications.
- Finding Meaning, Facing Fears Living Fully Twixt Midlife and Retirement (45-65) Second Edition (2021) Cognella Academic Publishing
- Real World Couple Counseling and Therapy: An introductory guide (2020, Cognella Academic Publishing – with Terence Patterson)
- Basics of Group Counseling and Psychotherapy: An introductory Guide (2019, Cognella Academic Publishing - with Lawrence S. Peltz and Susan Bernadett- Shapiro)
- Pragmatic Existential Counseling and Psychotherapy: Intimacy, Intuition and the Search for Meaning" (2016, Sage).
- When She’s Pregnant: The Essential Guide for Expectant Fathers" (2014, Ex Libris).
- Finding Meaning, Facing Fears in the Autumn of Your Years (45-65) (2012, Impact Publishers). Winner of 2013 Alpha Sigma Nu (Jesuit Honor Society) Book of the Year Award.
- Brief Group Treatment: Practical Training for Therapists and Counselors (1998, Brooks.Cole - with Lawrence S. Peltz and Susan Bernadett-Shapiro)
- Becoming a Father: Contemporary Social, Developmental and Clinical Perspectives (1995, Springer Publishing – Ed. with Michael J. Diamond and Martin Greenberg). Winner of a 1995 "Book of the Year" award from the American Journal of Nursing.
- The Measure of a Man: Becoming the Father You Wish Your Father Had Been (1993, Delacorte; paperback 1995, Berkeley). Also in several translations and foreign editions.
- Trance on Trial (1989, Guilford Press - with Alan W. Sheflin). Winner of Manfred Guttmacher Award (1991). Highest honor for literature granted by the American Psychiatric Association.
- When Men are Pregnant: Fears and Concerns of Expectant Fathers (1987, Impact Publishers; paperback 1993, Delta). Also in several translations and foreign editions.
- Classic Readings in Educational Psychology (1986, Ginn Publishing) - with Harold Ayabe.
- Methods of Group Psychotherapy and Encounter: A Tradition of Innovation (1978, Peacock Publishing)

Additionally, he has authored 51 professional refereed articles, 21 chapters in professional edited collections, several peer book reviews, 15 trade publications and over 150 presentations & symposia.

== Media ==
Shapiro has served as a media expert for the American Psychological Association and for Santa Clara University. He has appeared on over 200 radio and television programs, locally across the U.S. and Canada, nationally ( e.g., CBS morning Show, CBS Evening News, ABC News, NBC, NPR, The Oprah Winfrey Show, CNN, WWOR, AP Radio, Mutual), and internationally (e.g., AFRTS, CHUM).

His work on fatherhood has been cited in major national and international media, including the newspapers: New York Times, the Wall Street Journal, Boston Globe, San Jose Mercury News, Toronto Globe and Mail, Chicago Tribune, Los Angeles Times, Nashville Banner). It has also been featured in popular periodicals, including Time, People, Parents, Parenting, Self, Bridal Guide, Men’s Health, Ladies Home Journal, Bottom Line Personal, Playboy, Men’s Health), as well as numerous websites geared to parenting, male-female relationships and child-rearing

Finally, he has authored articles for Parents, The San Francisco Sunday Examiner, Huffington Post, and Psychology Today.
