= Don J. Snyder =

American novelist and screenwriter (born 1950)

- Born: 1950 (age 75–76); Pennsylvania, U.S.
- Occupations: Novelist, screenwriter
- Website: donjsnyder.com

Don J. Snyder (born 1950, Pennsylvania) is an American novelist and screenwriter.

In the beginning, Snyder locked himself in rooms for twelve years, teaching himself how to write sentences about love and loss, in a world where all we ever really have in common are the ways we can be broken. He dreamed his books would be published by the publishing houses of New York City—a million miles away. "I wanted this so badly that if someone had said, 'Okay, cut off your right arm and we'll make your dream real.' I would have said, No, thanks. But you can cut off my left. All I wanted was to become a novelist. Because I believed that people can buy what they WANT at the mall or on line. And even what they NEED. But not what THEY LONG FOR. They long for meaning. And that's where serious writers come in. They deliver meaning to people.”

   When he was 27 Snyder worked for a newspaper up north on the coast of Maine. There was a blizzard tearing through the town his second day on the job. The light on his desk was the only light on in town. He saw a man walking through the storm, straight to his door.  In that moment, he felt his life begin to turn. "The stranger kicked the snow off his boots and said he had a story to tell me. But I was called away and I asked him to come back the next day. On his way to see me, he dropped dead in the snow. I wrote his obituary. His widow told me that he was a soldier and a POW in the Korean War who the Army sent to prison as a traitor. All his life he claimed he was innocent and his wife believed him. Now she asked me if I could find the truth." It took Snyder 6 years to research and write the story that proved the soldier's innocence in his first published book, A SOLDIER'S DISGRACE, that took him to Hollywood when Paramount Pictures purchased the film rights. "I had dreamed of bringing some peace to this soldier's widow. I had fought the FBI and the United States Army for six years who always insisted that the soldier's records had been destroyed in a fire.  I found them. But the price was high." 
   That book and the first chapters of a novel earned his passage into the Iowa Writers Workshop where he won their most prestigious fellowship. "Iowa City is where Colleen and I lived together after eloping in England. It is where our first baby was born. It is the place where I stood on the front steps of the Iowa Memorial Union under a sky swept with stars, with Colin Harrison, as we took the pledge to spend our lives writing books that deprived the world of some of its loneliness and its indifference no matter what this might cost us." 
   Iowa led to two novels published in New York in the next two years, a James A. Michener fellowship, and a year teaching writing at Colby College where his second daughter was born, before Snyder took his family to Ireland. "In County Wicklow all we had was each other. We lived on love and air and heartbreaking beauty, among generous people who were all as poor as we were. We belonged to an aristocracy of beggars. Perfect for a writer who is always begging God or the stars to give him the story, begging for the sentences to tell the story, begging for the strength to write the story well enough, begging for someone to publish the story with a certain measure of dignity so you can support your family, begging for people to read the story. Soon we had four children all under the age of seven and during that time I began awaking at 4 am to write in bed beside Colleen and the babies, a habit I would continue for the rest of my writing life, long after these babies had grown up and left home. Writing from darkness into light and growing more and more certain that if you have been loved by a girl who pours her desire upon you and places one stunning baby after another in your arms, you have shared the sacred time, and been granted immortality." 
   For the rest of his life, those years with babies inspired his work. "We owned nothing, but we were rich. My daughters were twelve, fourteen and sixteen when Hollywood turned a screenplay of mine into a movie and I took them to Beverly Hills to buy them the first nice dresses I could afford. I was 50 years old. I always tell young writers that God will watch over them if they never contribute to the violence or the meanness or the shallowness of the world." 
   In 1993 after losing his job as a professor, he and his family were refugees in Maine before he found work on a winter construction crew building a mansion on the coast. "Some mornings it was 26 below zero. It was Colin Harrison who told me I should write about this." It became a cover story for Harper's Magazine and the New York Times Sunday Magazine and a memoir called The Cliff Walk that was published by Little Brown. Disney bought the film rights for a movie and signed Curtis Hansen to direct. "This returned us to Ireland again where I had the privilege of watching my four children walk with their mother through the  little village outside Sligo where her grandmother had left her parents the morning her journey to Elis Island began in 1919." 
   The Cliff Walk landed Snyder on Oprah's stage and soon led him to a remarkable discovery when he learned at age 49 that the only mother he had ever known was actually his stepmother and that own real mother had died just nine months after marrying his father, and sixteen days after giving birth to him and his twin brother in August 1950. "She was nineteen years old. And her name was Peggy. When I learned of this, my father's health was failing, so I set out to research his love story with my mother he had lost so that I might give it back to him at the end of his time. OF TIME & MEMORY, was published by Alfred A. Knopf and was the first book Oprah chose to make into a book video. I learned that my young mother had taken a secret to her grave that only her doctor knew. I found him when he was 78 years old. At first he kept his promise to her and lied to me that she had never been his patient. But in time he told me that he had failed to persuade her to save her life by letting him end the pregnancy. She made this doctor promise that he would never tell anyone that her twin babies had caused her death. She did not want my brother and me to know that we had ended her life. And she did not want her husband to know that she had chosen her unborn babies over him because she feared that if he knew this, he might not be able to be a good father to us." Shattered by her death, his father slept that autumn on her grave. Over the next fourteen years Snyder would write a film adaptation of Of Time & Memory as well as a series under the title—THE TIME THEY HAD. "I wrote 7 days a week for 14 years about how we never really know the love story that carried us into this world. Those people in the old black and white photographs remain strangers to us all our lives. Which may be why we are often strangers to ourselves. You've seen the same photographs: The young husbands in their crew cuts. The wives in their lipstick and nylon stockings. Their arms around each other, and their eyes bright with passion as if they almost believed that they would go on forever that way, so that at the end of their lives they would not have to wish that they had loved each other better when they had the chance." 
   Not long after OF TIME & MEMORY was published by Knopf, Snyder was up early writing when he heard on the morning news of a bombing in Northern Ireland in the town of Omagh. "Someone set off the bomb on the day when mothers took their children to the town center to buy their back-to-school uniform. Thirty nine people were  slaughtered. Twenty hours after I heard the news I was walking through the wreckage of the town. The children's patches from their school blazers were scattered through the streets like leaves.I went to 13 funerals, walking in the long processions to the grave yards. I stayed in a hotel for a month and then returned the next year to write a novel set against the backdrop of the bombing. NIGHT CROSSING was published by Knopf in 2001. I fictionalized everything except the name of Avril Monaghan who was killed in the bombing. She was holding the hand of her three year old daughter, and two weeks from delivering the twin girls in her belly. All of them were killed.They buried the four of them together in the only square grave I had ever seen." 
   Three more novels followed but Snyder was finally crippled by his mother's story and the Clinical Depression that had plagued him from the time he was a little boy.  He found peace working two seasons as a caddie in Scotland, preparing to caddie for his son, Jack, on his first pro tour. His book, WALKING WITH JACK, came next. And in 2019, he founded the world's only caddie school for soldiers in St. Andrews, Scotland that helps soldiers rise above the darkness of war that haunts them. Interviewed on the ToDay Show Snyder said, "witnessing the humble nobility of these soldiers and helping them recover the dignity they are entitled to, has been the great privilege of my life."  
   Snyder's 11th book- THE TIN NOSE SHOP, a novel he worked on for six years, was published by The Legends Ltd of London in July, 2022 and chosen as a BBC Radio2 Book Club selection. This novel reveals a last untold story of WWI, about the soldiers who wore masks the rest of their lives to hide their mutilated faces. It opens with these words:  For most of us, it takes a while to realise that we cross lines in our lives. Silent, unmarked borders of time that we pass, as if in our dreams, without ever realizing what we are leaving behind.  We do not see that the matchless nights of being cherished and held close are vanishing even as we live them, and that we are all refugees from one war torn country or another, or from one war torn love story or another.  Time moves so deceptively that we never say, ‘This is the last walk I will take with you along the shore.’ Or ‘This afternoon I carried a child in my arms for the final time.’ Perhaps early this morning while we dressed and put the kettle on, our destiny advanced unwatched.  
   Snyder's 12th book, JOHNNY COOPER’S FIELD, a novel set in Paris and in the village of Elie, Scotland was published by Legends Ltd of London in August 2025. 
   In 2018 after learning that 22 US soldiers were killing themselves each day, 10 a day in Canada and 9 a day in the UK, Snyder established the world's only Caddie School For Soldiers. 
   On December 12, 2024, Snyder left Scotland to spend the winter in the war in Ukraine writing a book about a woman who lost her husband and only brother in the war there, to try to make the world care about the suffering and the stunning courage of the Ukrainian people. That book, THE TIME THEY HAD, was published in July 2026 in London.

== Bibliography ==
Novels

- Soldier's Disgrace: US Army Officer as POW in Korea. Dublin NH: Yankee Books. 1987. ISBN 0-89909-139-3.
- Veterans Park. Ballantine Books. 1988. ISBN 978-0-8041-0286-5.
- From the Point (1988) reprint. Ivy Books. 1989. ISBN 978-0-8041-0397-8.
- Fallen Angel. Simon and Schuster. 2001. ISBN 978-0-7434-2369-4.
- Night Crossing. Alfred A. Knopf. 2001. ISBN 978-0-375-40906-6.
- Winter dreams. Doubleday. 2004. ISBN 978-0-385-50850-6.
- The Winter Travelers (2012), Downeast Books
- The Tin Nose Shop (2022), The Legends Press

Non-fiction

- The cliff walk : a memoir of a job lost and a life found. Little, Brown and Company. 1998. ISBN 978-0-316-80348-9.
- Of time and memory : a mother's story (1999)Alfred A. Knopf.
- Of time and memory : My Parents' Love Story. Random House. 2001. ISBN 978-0-345-42769-4. (trade paperback)

- Walking With Jack, A father's journey/ publisher=Doubleday/ 2013
