= Bob Gastaldo =

American geoscientist

- Born: Robert Angelo Gastaldo; December 31, 1950 (age 75)
- Education: Gettysburg College
- Scientific career
- Workplaces: Colby College

Robert Angelo Gastaldo (born December 31, 1950) is an American geoscientist, paleontologist and sedimentologist. He was professor of geology at Colby College in Waterville, Maine, between 1999 and 2020.

Gastaldo regularly studies in South Africa. In 2023, he was studying fossils in Bethulie, in the country's Karoo region. The fossils are of the largest mass extinction ever, known as the Permian–Triassic extinction event (also known as the "Great Dying").

== Early life ==
Gastaldo is a graduate of Gettysburg College, where he was mentored by Professor Bill Darrah.

He obtained his Master of Science from Southern Illinois University in 1975. He received his Ph.D. from the same institution three years later.

== Recognition ==
In 2016, he was awarded the Gilbert H. Cady Award by the Energy Division of the Geological Society of America, for his contribution to the field of coal geology. He has also received two Fulbright awards.

== Television ==
He was a scientific script consultant on an upcoming episode of the PBS program Nova.

== Personal life ==
Gastaldo is married to Elvira Herman Gastaldo.

In 1994, Gastaldo was elected a fellow of the Geological Society of America, and an inaugural centennial fellow of the Paleontological Society in 2008.

Gastaldo is a member of Sigma Xi, the Scientific Research Honor Society.
