= Eugène Hilarian Abadie =

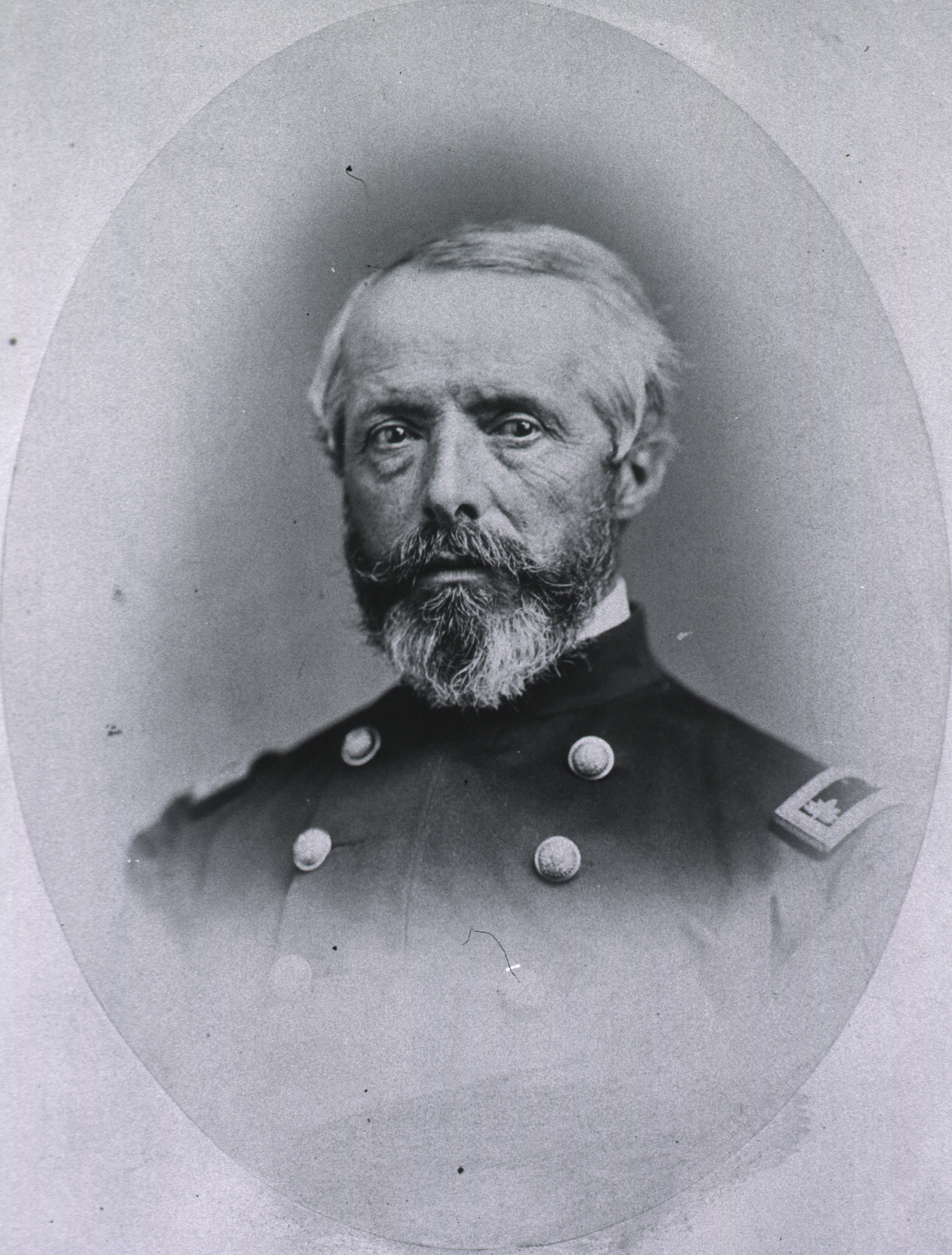
- Born: August 16, 1810; Paris
- Died: December 12, 1874 (aged 64); St. Louis
- Occupation: Surgeon

Eugène Hilarian Abadie (August 16, 1810 – December 12, 1874) was a U.S. Army surgeon in the American Civil War.

Eugène Hilarian Abadie was born on August 16, 1810 in Paris. He entered the U. S. army in 1836, with the rank of assistant surgeon. In 1853 he was promoted surgeon, and as such served through the Civil War, receiving the brevet rank of colonel in March, 1865. His first service was with the Creek nation, then recently removed from their hereditary lands in Georgia, and until the Seminole war he was engaged with the migrating tribes. After this service he was stationed at the forts in New York harbor, and at various regular posts in the interior until the war with Mexico, where he was on duty in 1848, but was ordered to Port Isabel, Texas, in 1849. Changing from station to station as the exigencies of the service demanded, he was in Texas when the U. S. forces in that state were surrendered by General David E. Twiggs, and before the close of 1861 he was paroled as a prisoner of war and permitted to go north. He was stationed at West Point in 1862-'64, during which period he was detailed to serve on medical boards in Philadelphia and New York. In 1865 he became chief medical officer of the military division of west Mississippi, in 1866 medical director of the department of Missouri, and lastly acting assistant medical purveyor at St. Louis. Eugène Hilarian Abadie died on 12 December 1874 in St. Louis. At the time of his death he had seen more years of actual service than any, save two, of the army surgeons.
