= Oak Grove-Coburn School =

Independent coed preparatory school in Maine

Coordinates: 44.4665°N 69.6720°W

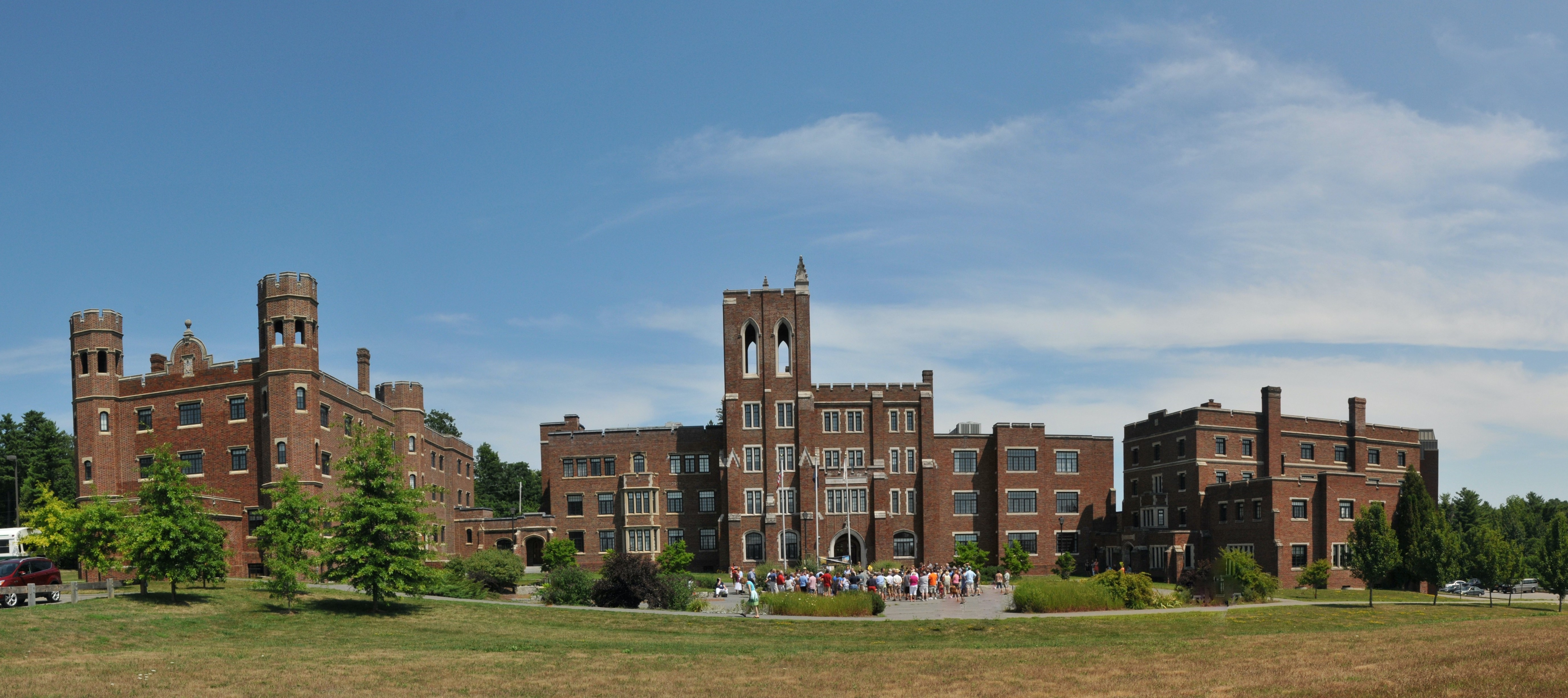
Oak Grove-Coburn School

Oak Grove-Coburn School (OGC) was an independent coeducational college preparatory school in Vassalboro, Maine, which operated from 1970 through 1989. OGC was a school for both day students and boarding students, grades 6 through 12. The school was housed on the former Oak Grove School's 500-acre campus.

== History ==
In 1970, two private schools that had operated since the 1800s, Oak Grove School and Coburn Classical Institute, merged to form Oak Grove-Coburn. Coburn Classical Institute, founded in 1828, was a coeducational day high school in Waterville, Maine. Oak Grove School, founded in 1849, was a Quaker boarding school for girls, in Vassalboro.

The school closed in 1989 due to financial difficulties. The main building is now the site of the Maine Criminal Justice Academy. The historic chapel is run by a non-profit board, Friends of Oak Grove Chapel. The proceeds of the sale of the school were used to create Oak Grove School Foundation, which makes grants to fund the educational and cultural needs of secondary students in central Maine. Alumni continue to organize well-attended all-school reunions every three to five years.

== Campus ==
The campus featured a main castle-like building on the top of a hill overlooking the Kennebec River. The main building had three sections:

- Owen Hall, which contained the classrooms, auditorium, gymnasium, library and headmaster's apartment
- Senior house, which contained the dining room, the "senior living room", the girls dorm, and faculty apartments
- Briggs Hall, which contained the boys dormitory and faculty apartments.

The campus also featured a historic chapel (built in 1786), a stable, the "Old Gym," faculty houses, athletic fields, and many miles of trails through the woods, as well as a disused ski slope.

== People ==
The student body, which ranged from 100 to 175 students, was composed mainly of day students from Vassalboro, Waterville, Augusta and the surrounding area. Vassalboro did not have a high school, but the town paid the tuition for its high school-aged students at OGC or local public schools. The boarding school population was never more than about 50 students, but OGC attracted students from across the country and some international students. Almost all graduates went on to college.

The school, which maintained a Quaker affiliation, was known for its diversity, community atmosphere and close student-faculty relationships. It was also known for its innovative curriculum, which included Wednesday Program and Project Week, where students took interdisciplinary classes and had opportunities for non-academic learning experiences. The school made national news in 1979 when students circulated a petition as part of a history assignment asking for a repeal of the Bill of Rights, without naming the Constitution specifically.

In sports, the OGC boys' basketball team won two Class D Maine State Championships in 1978 and 1979 and made it to the championship game in 1983, 1984 and 1985.

=== Headmasters ===
OGC had four headmasters.

1970-1973	Andrew C. Holmes
1973-1979	Fred B. Steinberg
1979-1981	Dan Fredricks
1981-1989	Dale Hanson

=== Alumni ===
Notable alumni include TV star Titus Welliver (Class of 1980), musician Ilene Barnes (Class of 1978), labor leader Jesse Sharkey (Class of 1988), editorial cartoonist Greg Kearney (Class of 1976) and civil rights lawyer and professor Michael J. Steinberg (Class of 1979).
