= Ida Fuller =

American sorority founder (died 1930)

- Born: Ida Mabel Fuller; November 28, 1854; Albion, Maine, U.S.
- Died: September 26, 1930 (aged 75); Oakland, California, U.S.
- Resting place: Greenwood Cemetery, Eureka, Kansas
- Education: Colby College
- Known for: Founder of Sigma Kappa
- Spouse: Jonathan B. Pierce

Ida Mable Fuller Pierce (November 28, 1854 – September 26, 1930) was one of the founders of Sigma Kappa sorority.

== Early life ==
Ida Fuller was born on November 28, 1854, in Albion, Maine. Her parents were Louise J. and David B. Fuller. She grew up in Albion. Fuller completed the Ladies Preparatory Course at the Waterville Classical Institute in Waterville, Maine.

She was twenty years old when she decided to attend Colby College, the first New England college to go fully co-educational. Although Fuller men had always attended Colby, her brother Blin Fuller refused to go to Colby if she enrolled. When she passed the entrance exam and was accepted by Colby in 1873, Blin decided to go to Bowdoin College instead.

While at Colby College, she helped establish Sigma Kappa sorority in 1874. However, she left the college during her junior year due to illness and never graduated.

== Sigma Kappa ==
Only four other women attended Colby College with Fuller in 1873. Fuller and Mary Caffrey Low Carver, Elizabeth Gorham Hoag, Frances Elliott Mann Hall, and Louise Helen Coburn decided to form a literary and social society. (Coburn and Hoag were classmates of Fuller at the Waterville Classical Institute.) They were instructed by the college administration that they would need to present a constitution and bylaws with a petition requesting permission to form Sigma Kappa Sorority. They began work during that year, and on November 9, 1874, received a letter from the faculty approving their petition.

Fuller continued to be active in the sorority after graduation and marriage. She helped her niece, Abby Louise Fuller, established the Xi chapter of Sigma Kappa at the University of Kansas. Blin's other daughter, Illde W. Fuller, also joined the Xi chapter. Ida Fuller Pierce also served as the Xi chapter's housemother.

She was honored at the sorority's 39th annual convention in Denver, Colorado in July 1913. She also gave an address about coeducation. She also attended the 1924 Golden Jubilee Convention of Sigma Kappa.

== Personal life ==
After leaving Colby College, Fuller went to Kansas in 1880 to seek a drier climate for her health. In Kansas, she met and married Jonathan B. Pierce on July 7, 1878. Pierce was a physician and pharmacist. The couple lived in Eureka, Kansas, where she was active in club and social life. Her husband predeceased her in May 5, 1890.

After her husband died in 1890, she was the vice-president of a Kansas bank and established the Girls' Hotel in Kansas City, an affordable accommodation for lower-income women. During World War I, she was in charge of organizing supply depots for the American Red Cross in Eureka and also lectured on food conservation across the United States. She was a relief worker during the 1906 San Francisco earthquake.

In her last two years, she lived at 1176 Sunnyhill Road in Oakland, California, with Mrs. F. G. Battram. She died on September 26, 1930, aged 76, in Oakland. She was buried at Greenwood Cemetery in Eureka.
