= Stephanie Doyon =

American novelist

- Born: Maine, U.S.
- Education: Colby College (BA)
- Occupation: Novelist
- Children: 2

Stephanie Doyon (born Maine) is an American novelist best known for her novel, The Greatest Man in Cedar Hole. The novel was published in 2005 by Simon & Schuster.

== Biography ==
Stephanie Doyon grew up in rural Maine. She received a B.A. in English Literature from Colby College, where she studied writing with Jennifer Boylan and Pulitzer Prize-winning author Richard Russo. She has stated her "graduate school in writing" came from working as a ghost writer, where she had to learn a great deal about plot structure, character, and deadlines.

Doyon lives in Maine with her husband and two daughters, where she is currently at work on a new novel.

== Career ==
After college, Doyon moved to New York City and worked as an accounting clerk at a small literary agency. In her spare time, she moonlighted as a ghostwriter for a popular series of teen books. In 1999, she created her own teen series, a quartet of books called On the Road, which chronicled the adventures of a high school graduate who takes a year off before college to travel across the United States. The series was optioned for television.

In 2005, Stephanie bid goodbye to teen writing with the release of her first adult literary novel, The Greatest Man in Cedar Hole. The novel drew wide acclaim from publications such as The New York Times and The Boston Globe, comparing her work to the likes of Anne Tyler and Mark Twain. Cedar Hole was named one of the best books of the year by Library Journal and was the winner of the Maine Literary Award for Fiction.

Doyon has noted her influences as John Irving, John Steinbeck, and Richard Russo. She and Russo maintain contact today.

== Bibliography ==
- The Greatest Man in Cedar Hole (Simon & Schuster, 2005)
