= Louise Helen Coburn =

American botanist and founder of Sigma Kappa (1856–1949)

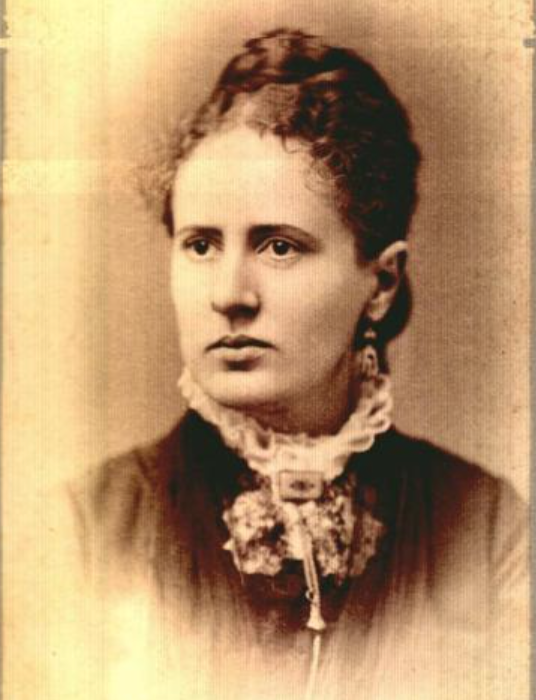
- Born: September 1, 1856; Skowhegan, Maine, US
- Died: February 7, 1949 (aged 93); Skowhegan, Maine, US
- Education: Colby College
- Occupations: Botanist and poet
- Known for: Founder of Sigma Kappa
- Family: Stephen Coburn (father)

Louise Helen Coburn (September 1, 1856 – February 7, 1949) was one of the five founders of Sigma Kappa sorority, a pioneer for women's education at Colby College, where she served as the first female trustee, and an accomplished scientist and writer known for writing the two volumes of Skowhegan on the Kennebec.

== Early life and education ==
Coburn was born September 1, 1856 in Skowhegan, Maine. Her family's home was at the intersection of Elm and Pleasant Streets near the banks of the Kennebec River. She was the daughter of Stephen Coburn, a prominent Maine politician and lawyer. Her uncle was Abner Coburn, Governor of Maine from 1863 to 1864.

Colby College, in Waterville, Maine, became the first New England college to admit women along with men. Coburn was second-generation attendee of Colby College. Her father had graduated from Colby in 1839. The Coburns, prominent and wealthy, were invaluable to Colby's growth as benefactors of the college. Despite this, 18-year-old Louise was heavily scrutinized for admission to Colby. A professor tested her one day from nine in the morning to five in the afternoon on her skills in Latin and Greek to see if she could measure up to Colby's standards.

In 1890, some male students of Colby became concerned that women were doing so well in their classes and protested. Ernest C. Marriner, author of "History of Colby College," wrote: "No small part of the agitation that arose later in regard to the retention of women in the College was prompted by the fact that they persistently ran away with the honors." Due to these conflicts, President Albion Small introduced a plan to end coeducation at Colby and separate women and men into different classes. Coburn, along with her old friend Mary Low Carver, drafted a petition along with 17 other female graduates of Colby to protest the move. Carver wrote most of the letter, but she wrote it in a way that it appeared that Louise had, due to her family's financial ties to the school.

The women wrote in their petition: "The College seeks to justify itself by an alleged act of higher generosity. She will establish within her precincts a college for women, in which they may go to even higher achievements. But by that decision the College confesses that she made a mistake twenty years ago, and thus places her present alumnae in the anomalous position of being the visible evidence of that mistake." At first, the women were hesitant to speak out, but they knew they must voice their discontent with Small's decision. Mary Low Carver knew that Coburn's name had to be on the petition in order to give it weight with the college. She wrote to her friend, "We do want you to help us. It seems as if we can't have it otherwise. Your name and influence would have the weight of a dozen of the other names."

Even with a Coburn name on the petition, however, the proposal passed and Colby College split into two separate educational establishments, one for men and one for women. Coburn was appointed to the committee to lead the new Women's Division. Despite her disapproval of the plan, she accepted the appointment to ensure Colby women received the best education possible. She pushed for women to be represented more in the college, and she became the first female Trustee of the college in 1911. She also served as the first President of the Colby Alumnae Association. She lobbied Colby to appoint its first female professor, Ninetta May Runnals, and was a strong advocate that Colby should provide better housing for its female students, which it eventually did.

Colburn excelled in an academic environment and became the second woman to graduate from Colby, with Phi Beta Kappa status.

== Sigma Kappa ==
Mary Caffrey Low was the first female student at Colby, and for two years remained the only one. Eventually she was joined by four other women at Colby College. Along with Elizabeth Gorham Hoag, Ida Fuller, Frances Elliott Mann Hall and Coburn, Low created Sigma Kappa sorority at Colby on November 9, 1874.

Coburn is known for writing a large portion of the Sigma Kappa initiation ceremony.

Being the only women in the college, the five founders were frequently together. In 1873-74, the five young women decided to form a literary and social society. They were instructed by the college administration that they would need to present a constitution and bylaws with a petition requesting permission to form Sigma Kappa Sorority. They began work during that year and on November 9, 1874, the five young women received a letter from the faculty approving their petition. They sought for and received permission to form a sorority with the intent for the organization to become national.

The sorority's Alpha, Beta and Gamma chapters were founded at Colby. However, Colby has since prohibited sororities and fraternities, ensuring that the Alpha chapter of Sigma Kappa which Coburn initiated cannot exist for the foreseeable future.

== Career ==
Coburn was trained as a botanist, and she wrote science books and pamphlets in addition to being the editor of the "Maine Naturalist." In addition to her scientific pursuits, she wrote "Skowhegan on the Kennebec" and was regarded as a fine poet.

== Personal life ==
Louise had the pleasure of seeing Sigma Kappa grow beyond her initial dreams of what it could be. Her family became very involved in the sorority. Her sister, Grace Coburn Smith, Alpha, became National President of Sigma Kappa. Two of her nieces, Louise Coburn Smith Velten and Helen Coburn Smith Fawcett, are Alpha chapter initiates. Joseph Coburn Smith, her nephew, married Ervena Goodale of Alpha chapter.

Later in life, Coburn continued to live in Skowhegan at the family home where she was born. In 1936, at eighty years of age, she purchased a vacant cottage on the south side of Elm Street, across from her home. She added a wing as a museum room and a repository for her writings and her research papers. Many early town records and maps filled this room as well as historic documents and a library of historical research books

The 1939 brick cottage was restored and renovated to its original state as nearly as was possible to determine, and filled with furnishings, antiques and items of everyday living. Her theme was to furnish the cottage as it would have appeared during the middle 19th century. All items in the collection were donated by families that lived in Skowhegan.

She welcomed visitors to her home as her strength allowed. She became completely bedridden but remained mentally alert, reading often and singing hymns when reading tired her. One of her letters to her Sigma Kappa sisters ended, "May the loving spirit of Sigma Kappa continue to guide you."

Coburn was 93 when she died February 7, 1949. She lived the longest life of any of the founders. Upon her death, she deeded the Skowhegan History House Museum to the Bloomfield Academy Trust, with the stipulation that the property be maintained and kept open as a museum for the public during the summer. The museum is still open for visitors and many relics of Louise Coburn's life can be seen, such as a doll house her father made for her and gifts from her grandfather.

== Selected works ==
- Kate Furbish, Botanist: An Appreciation. 1924.
- Skowhegan on the Kennebec, Skowhegan, ME: The Independent-Reporter Press. 1941
