= Mary Caffrey Low =

American librarian and educator

Mary Caffrey Low Carver
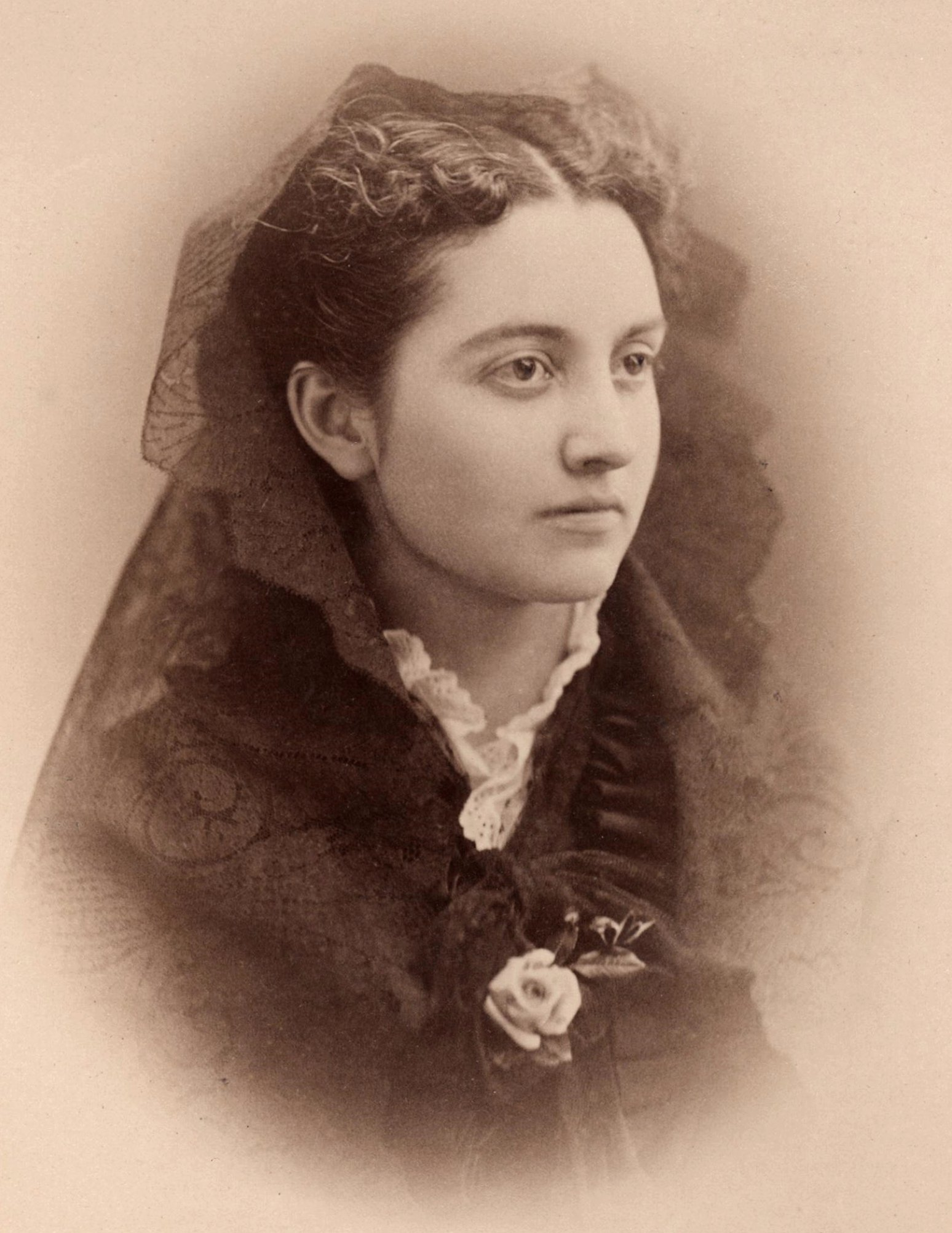
- Mary Caffrey Low in 1875
- Born: March 22, 1850
- Died: March 4, 1926 (aged 75)
- Occupation: Librarian

Mary Caffrey Low Carver (March 22, 1850 - March 4, 1926) was an American librarian and educator. She was one of the five founding members of the Sigma Kappa sorority and a pioneering advocate for women's education, along with being an accomplished library scientist and writer. She was also the first female student of Colby College.

== Founding of Sigma Kappa Sorority ==
Colby College, in Waterville, Maine, became the first New England college to admit women along with men when Low became the first female student at Colby in 1871, and for two years remained the only one. Eventually she was joined by four other women, and along with Elizabeth Gorham Hoag, Ida Fuller, Frances Elliott Mann Hall and Louise Helen Coburn, Low created Sigma Kappa sorority at Colby on November 9, 1874. Low was the first woman to appear on the rolls of Sigma Kappa and the first to preside over an initiation. She was also the first woman to be invited to join the Phi Beta Kappa academic honor society.

As the only women enrolled in the college, the five of them found themselves together frequently. In 1873–74, the five young women decided to form a literary and social society. They were instructed by the college administration that they would need to present a constitution and bylaws with a petition requesting permission to form Sigma Kappa Sorority. They began work during that year and on November 9, 1874, the five young women received a letter from the faculty approving their petition. They sought for and received permission to form a sorority with the intent for the organization to become national.

== Accomplishments at Colby College ==
In July 1875, Low became the first female graduate of Colby College, at 25 years of age. She was the valedictorian of her class. She was one of the first women in America to receive a full-fledged Bachelor of Arts degree. In those days, it was not customary for women to give public speeches, especially at solemn occasions such as graduation ceremonies, but Low gave the class prayer in Latin, but not the valedictory speech. Colby's website now calls her the "grandmother of coeducation at Colby."

In "The History of Colby College," Ernest C. Marriner wrote, "No small part of the agitation that arose later in regard to the retention of women in the College was prompted by the fact that they persistently ran away with the honors." In 1890, the president of Colby initiated a plan to divide women and men into separate classes at the college. Low, along with Louise Coburn and 17 other women who had graduated from Colby, sent a petition protesting the move. The letter declared, "The issue is not whether men and women can recite together, whether men and women shall study this or that. It is simply the issue whether the men are willing to take the risk of having women surpass them in scholarship." Although Low wrote the letter, she wrote it in a way to make it appear that Coburn had, since Coburn came from a prominent family and Low did not. In the end, Colby did not go back to being officially coeducational until 1969.

However, in honor of her achievements, Colby presented her with an honorary doctorate in 1916. By 1924, the school's student body consisted of two-thirds women, a fitting testimonial to Low's pioneering attitude for the school.

== Personal life ==
After graduation, Low married Leonard D. Carver, who became the Maine state librarian in Augusta, and she became a schoolteacher. She grew interested in the field of library science and then became a librarian herself, beginning the first card catalogue of the Maine State Library. She was also an accomplished writer.

Her daughter, Ruby, was initiated into the Alpha chapter at Colby. Ruby Carver Emerson became National President of Sigma Kappa in 1935–36. Low was always interested in the future of her sorority. The chapter minutes of the 1880s and 1890s frequently refer to the choosing of delegates to travel to the town of Augusta to consult Mrs. Carver on everything from the selection of furniture to the decision to extend Sigma Kappa beyond Colby.

Later in life, Low lived with her daughter in Cambridge, Massachusetts and delighted Boston Sigma Kappas with her wit. She offered toasts at the joint Delta/Omicron chapter initiation banquets. Mary was hearing-impaired, but she read lips so well that few recognized her deafness.

She died March 4, 1926, at the age of 75.

== Legacy ==
Today, Sigma Kappa presents the Mary Caffrey Low Award to the most outstanding alumnae chapter in a college community.

In addition, Colby College has honored her achievements by naming a residence hall, the Mary Low Residence Hall, after their first female graduate. The hall features the Mary Low Coffeehouse, a coffee shop that hosts poetry readings and open mic nights and serves as a general hangout for the student population at Colby.
