= Sigma Kappa =

North American collegiate sorority

- ΣΚ
- Founded: November 9, 1874; 151 years ago Colby College
- Type: Social
- Affiliation: NPC
- Status: Active
- Scope: North America
- Motto: "One Heart, One Way"
- Pillars: Personal Growth, Friendship, Service, Loyalty
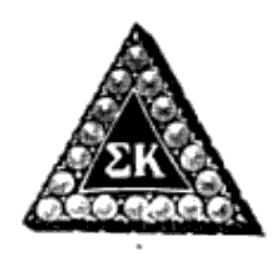
- Member badge
- Colors: Maroon and Lavender
- Symbol: Heart
- Flower: Wild purple violet
- Jewel: Pearl
- Mascot: Dove
- Publication: Sigma Kappa Triangle
- Philanthropy: Inherit the Earth, Gerontology research, Maine Sea Coast Mission; Alzheimer's disease research
- Chapters: 119 collegiate, 98 alumnae
- Members: 226,000 lifetime
- Headquarters: 695 Pro-Med Lane, Suite 300; Carmel, Indiana 46032-5323; United States
- Website: www.sigmakappa.org

Sigma Kappa (ΣΚ, also known as SK or Sig Kap) is a North American college sorority. It was founded in 1874 at Colby College in Waterville, Maine. The sorority has initiated 226,000 members, has 119 collegiate chapters, and has over 98 alumnae chapters. The sorority is a member of the National Panhellenic Conference (NPC).

== History ==
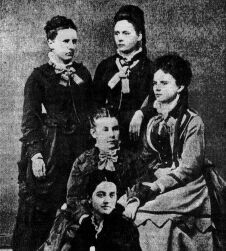
Sigma Kappa founders

In 1871, Mary Caffrey Low Carver became the first and only female student at Colby College in Maine until Elizabeth Gorham Hoag, Ida Mabel Fuller Pierce, Frances Elliott Mann Hall, and Louise Helen Coburn were admitted and enrolled in 1873. As the only women, they associated frequently and decided to form a society. They were instructed by the college administration that they would need to present a constitution and bylaws with a petition requesting permission to form Sigma Kappa. On November 9, 1874, the faculty approved their petition. Sigma Kappa annually celebrates November 9 as its Founders' Day.

Low was the first woman to appear on the sorority's rolls and the first to preside over an initiation, of which Coburn wrote a large portion. The first Sigma Kappa emblem was designed by Hoag, who died shortly thereafter of tuberculosis. Much of the original initiation music was written by Hoag's cousin, Emily Peace Meader, who was inducted shortly before Hoag died in 1875. Mann Hall was the first to marry (a fellow Colby student).

In the first constitution, chapters were limited to 25 members, and so Beta chapter and Gamma chapter were also established at Colby College as more joined. Early records indicate that the groups met together, but in 1893, the members voted to stop expanding inside the college, meaning that the Alpha chapter could initiate to the limit of 25, but Beta and Gamma chapters could initiate no more and would eventually disappear. The vote also meant that the members began expansion outside of Colby College.

Expansion began in 1904 at Boston University, and in 1905, Sigma Kappa joined the National Panhellenic Conference. In 1907, Sigma Kappa had initiated 400 members and had established six chapters. The sorority first published its magazine, the Sigma Kappa Triangle, in 1907. In 1912, its Seattle Mu chapter's first-year student, Dorothy Louise Anderson, who Lake Dorothy is named after, died of illness. Her parents, Ada Woodruff and Oliver Perkins Anderson, gave a lodge to the chapter on Puget Sound, used up until 1919.

In 1918, the sorority adopted the Maine Sea Coast Missionary Society as its first philanthropy interest. Its second philanthropy, begun in the aftermath of WWII in 1946, had an international focus, supporting the American Farm School of Thessaloniki, Greece. Its mission is complete; the Farm School effort has been discontinued. In 1924, Sigma Kappa established its first national headquarters in Reading, Massachusetts, which would move to Indianapolis, Indiana, in 1936. In 1937, it began sending out field consultants for collegiate chapters.

In 1954, Sigma Kappa adopted gerontology as its third and most extensive philanthropy, which continues to the present day. In 1959, the sorority absorbed another NPC social sorority, Pi Kappa Sigma, which had been formed in 1894 at Michigan State Normal College (Now Eastern Michigan University). In 1962, it established a separate branch, the Sigma Kappa Foundation, to manage its philanthropy funds, and added Alzheimer's disease as a focus for its gerontology philanthropy in 1984.

In 1992, it began another program as part of its gerontology initiatives, "Inherit the Earth". In 1993, Sigma Kappa established a housing corporation.

== Symbols ==
The Sigma Kappa coat of arms includes the symbols of the sorority: the dove, violet, Greek letters, and colors. Adopted in 1911, the coat of arms consists of a maroon shield with a diagonal gold bar on which are five lavender stars. The lower half has a coiled serpent, and the upper has a maroon and gold wreath. A silver dove is above the shield, with an arch of gold rays above the dove. Below is a silver scroll, bearing the open motto in black text and the date 1874.

Sigma Kappa's motto is "One Heart, One Way". Its colors are lavender and maroon. Its insignia is a dove and serpent. In June 1892, the violet was adopted as the official flower and specified in 2008 as the wild purple violet to distinguish it from other varieties of violets. The dove became an official symbol in 1984, and the heart in 1988.

Sigma Kappa's values or pillars are personal growth, friendship, service, and loyalty.

=== Badges ===
The current membership badge is a one-inch jeweled triangle with Greek letters "Σ" and "Κ". The triangle badge was chosen in 1894, and later, jeweled badges were approved at the 1915 convention when the pearl was adopted as the national jewel. Badges without jewels have a scroll edge. Badges are either made of silver, white gold, or yellow gold.

The new member pin is shaped as gold Greek letter "Κ" for Kappa with a serpent lacing through it to form the Greek letter "Σ" for Sigma. This design was adopted as the new member pin in 1920.

There are also alumni pins, 25-year pins, 50-year pins, and the "Pearl Court Pin", given to recipients of the Ernestine Duncan Collins Pearl Court Award.

== Philanthropies ==
In 1962, Sigma Kappa established a separate entity, the Sigma Kappa Foundation, and in 1989, it was incorporated as a 501(c)(3) nonprofit organization. Chapters raise funds for the Foundation, which then grants the funds towards: scholarships for leadership and tuition for its collegiate members, alumnae chapter funds, alumnae and collegiate crisis relief, and collegiate project grants, while donations made with specific restrictions may be given to specific scholarships or causes such as Alzheimer's research.

At a 1918 convention, the sorority voted to partner with the Maine Sea Coast Mission to aid communities and ecologies of coastal Maine. In 1954, gerontology was adopted as another main philanthropy of Sigma Kappa, with members encouraged to volunteer with the elderly. Beginning in 1984, the sorority added an emphasis on Alzheimer's disease research. The sorority also has an "Inherit the Earth" project that has goals of improving local environments. The first letter of Sigma Kappa's five philanthropies spell out the word "Sigma;" the philanthropies are the Sigma Kappa Foundation, Inherit the Earth, Gerontology, Maine Sea Cost Mission, and the Alzheimer's Association.

Many collegiate chapters of Sigma Kappa participate in The Walk to End Alzheimer's to raise money for the Alzheimer's Association. This money does not go through the Sigma Kappa Foundation but directly to the Alzheimer's Association. According to the Foundation's website: "Since becoming a Platinum National Walk team in 2016, Sigma Kappa has consistently raised more than $1,000,000 annually. In 2019, Sigma Kappa became a Diamond Level National Walk Team, the highest level for a national team for the Alzheimer's Association." Some chapters may also participate in hosting a variety of fundraising events called "Ultra Violet", a concept introduced in 2008, where all funds raised go to the Foundation's PULSE fund.

== Membership ==
As with all National Panhellenic Conference (NPC) sororities, women may join Sigma Kappa if they attend as an undergraduate at a university with an active chapter from which they receive a membership offer. Prospective members must meet the fraternity's national minimum GPA requirement (3.0/4.0) as well as the chapter's requirement. Alternatively, women past college-age may be invited or may apply to join via alumnae initiation if they are not already a member of another NPC sorority, a process which 20 of the 26 NPC members also participate in. Due to NPC agreements, no woman who has been initiated into another NPC sorority may join another one, although no NPC member is restricted from joining a professional or service Greek letter organization.

== Chapters ==
Sigma Kappa has 119 collegiate chapters and 98 alumnae chapters. The Delta chapter of Boston University is now the oldest existing chapter. The Eta chapter of Illinois Wesleyan University is the longest continuously running chapter. In 1984, Colby College banned fraternities and sororities, ensuring that the Alpha chapter will probably never be resurrected.

== Chapter houses ==
In 2005, Sigma Kappa's Mu Chapter House at the University of Washington obtained City of Seattle Landmark status, becoming the only sorority or fraternity in Seattle to achieve Historic Landmark status both at the City of Seattle and on the National Historic Register.

== Notable members ==
According to the sorority, it has initiated more than 185,000 women.

== See also ==
- List of social sororities and women's fraternities
- Sigma Delta, former, now unaffiliated Sigma Kappa chapter at Dartmouth College
