= Frances Elliott Mann Hall =

American educator and sorority founder

- Born: Frances Elliott Mann; October 6, 1853; Yarmouth, Maine, US
- Died: February 6, 1935 (aged 81); Washington, D.C., US
- Education: Colby College
- Occupations: Educator and school president
- Employer(s): Hall-Noyes School; Central High School
- Known for: founder of Sigma Kappa

Frances Elliott Mann Hall (October 6, 1853 – February 6, 1935) was an American educator, school administrator, and one of the five founders of Sigma Kappa sorority. She opened and operated the Hall-Noyes School in Washington, D.C.

== Early life ==
Frances Elliott Mann was born on October 6, 1853, in Yarmouth, Maine. She was a high school teacher in Rockport, Massachusetts. She felt she needed better professional training and enrolled in Colby College when she was in her early twenties. Colby College was the first New England college to admit women along with men. While at Colby, Mann was a founder of the Sigma Kappa sorority. However, she had to leave college in her junior year because of astigmatic headaches.

== Sigma Kappa ==
Mary Caffrey Low was the first female student at Colby College. After two years, she was joined by four other women, including Frances Elliott Mann. Being the only female students in the college, the five found themselves together frequently. In 1873–74, the five students decided to form a literary and social society. The college administration instructed them that they would need to present a constitution and bylaws with a petition requesting permission to form Sigma Kappa Sorority. They began work during that year and on November 9, 1874, the five young women received a letter from the faculty approving their petition.

Hall continued to be active with the sorority. She attended the 4th national convention of Sigma Kappa in Waterville, Maine in 1924. She attended the 1928 Sigma Kappa Convention in Washington, D.C. and the Saranac Convention in 1933.

== Career ==
Hall taught Latin at the Central High School in Washington, D.C. for 40 years. She worked with her husband who was also a teacher. Starting around 1904, she ran the Hall-Noyes School, a private school that prepared youths and adults for college and entrance exams for civil service, the United States Military Academy, and the United States Naval Academy. The school operated until the mid-1920s.

== Personal life ==
Mann married George Washington Hall, another Colby student.

She was a member of the Order of the Eastern Star. After her husband died, she replaced him as president of The Maine Association of Washington, D.C., also known as the Maine Society. This was a club for individuals from the state of Maine.

She died on February 6, 1935, in the Emergency Hospital in Washington, D.C. Reportedly, her last message before her death was, "Take my love to all the chapters. God bless them." She was buried in the Ledge Cemetery in Yarmouth, Maine.

The George Washington University chapter and Vanderbilt chapter of Sigma Kappa each held a memorial service to eulogize Hall.
