= List of presidents and trustees of Colby College =

The President and Trustees of Colby College is an 501(c) organization which is the governing body of Colby College, a private liberal arts college located in Waterville, Maine, United States. As of 2017, the president is David A. Greene, and the chair of the board is Eric S. Rosengren.

The organization provides general supervision of the administration and property of the college, including appointment of the president.

The bylaws of the corporation provide that membership shall consist of the current President, and not fewer than twenty-four nor more than thirty-five other trustees. Not fewer than six nor more than nine trustees shall be elected by the Colby College Alumni Association. The term of office of each trustee lasts five years. The corporation meets three times annually. Both the faculty and the student body may elect two members each as representatives to attend meetings of the corporation, but not as voting members.

== Presidents ==
Jeremiah Chaplin, founder and 1st president of Colby College

Order	Name	Position(s)	Term began	Term ended	Alumnus/na?	Reference
1	Rev. Jeremiah Chaplin	President	1822	1833	no	
2	Rev. Rufus Babcock	President	1833	1836	no	
3	Robert Everett Pattison	President	1836	1839	no	
4	Eliphaz Fay	President	1841	1843	no	
5	David Newton Sheldon	President	1843	1853	no	
6	Robert Everett Pattison	President	1854	1857	no	
7	James Tift Champlin	President	1857	1873	no	
8	Henry Ephraim Robins	President	1873	1882	no	
9	George Dana Boardman Pepper	President	1882	1889	no	
10	Albion Woodbury Small	President	1889	1892	1876	
11	Beniah Longley Whitman	President	1892	1895	no	
12	Nathaniel Butler Jr.	President	1896	1901	1873	
13	Charles Lincoln White	President	1901	1908	no	
14	Arthur J. Roberts	President	1908	1927	1890	
15	Franklin W. Johnson	President	1929	1942	1891	
16	J. Seelye Bixler	President	1942	1960	no	
17	Robert E. L. Strider	President	1960	1979	no	
18	William R. Cotter	President	1979	2000	no	
19	William Drea Adams	President	2000	2014	no	
20	David A. Greene	President	2014	present	no	

== Trustees ==
=== Chairs of the board ===
Order	Name	Graduated	Elected	Left/retired	Reference
1	Abner Coburn	n/a	1874	1885	
2	J. Warren Merrill	n/a	1885	1890	
3	Josiah Hayden Drummond	n/a	1890	1892	
4	Percival Bonney	1863	1902	1906	
5	Leslie C. Cornish	1875	1907	1926	
6	Herbert Elijah Wadsworth	1892	1926	1934	
7	George Otis Smith	1893	1934	1944	
8	George Goodwin Averill	1921	1944	1946	
9	Neil Leonard	1921	1946	1960	
10	Reginald Houghton Sturtevant	1921	1960	1965	
11	Ellerton Marcel Jette	n/a	1965	1971	
12	Albert Carlton Palmer	1930	1971	1979	
13	Robert N. Anthony	1938	1979	1983	
14	H. Ridgely Bullock	1955	1983	1991	
15	Lawrence Pugh	1956	1991	1999	
16	James Bartlett Crawford	1964	1999	2005	
17	Joseph F. Boulos	1968	2005	2009	
18	Robert E. Diamond, Jr.	1973	2009	2016	
19	Eric S. Rosengren	1979	2016	2022	
20	Jane M. Powers	1986	2022	present	

=== Other notable trustees ===
Name	Graduated	Elected	Left/retired	Reference
Mark Langdon Hill	n/a	1821	1826	
Lucius Bolles	n/a	1821	1842	
Adoniram Judson	n/a	1821	1823	
William King	n/a	1821	1848	
Mark Harris	n/a	1821	1842	
Albion Parris	n/a	1823	1826	
Joseph Torrey	n/a	1829	1834	
Baron Stow	n/a	1830	1852	
Jeremiah Chaplin	n/a	1833	1840	
George Evans	n/a	1837	1847	
Edward Kent	n/a	1838	1847	
Samuel Francis Smith	n/a	1840	1860	
Elijah Hamlin	n/a	1841	1847	
Josiah Pierce	n/a	1843	1858	
Abner Coburn	n/a	1845	1885	
Hiram Belcher	n/a	1847	1856	
Isaac Davis	n/a	1847	1855	
Edgar Harkness Gray	1838	1849	1853	
John Hubbard	n/a	1849	1862	
Ebenezer Knowlton	n/a	1851	1858	
Mark H. Dunnell	1849	1858	1867	
Lot M. Morrill	n/a	1862	1869	
J. Warren Merrill	n/a	1862	1890	
Gardner Colby	n/a	1865	1879	
Henry Sweetser Burrage	n/a	1881	1906	
George Dana Boardman Pepper	n/a	1882	1892	
Richard C. Shannon	1862	1889	1921	
Albion Woodbury Small	n/a	1890	1897	
Beniah Longley Whitman	n/a	1892	1896	
Eugene Foss	n/a	1897	1915	
Eugene Hale	n/a	1897	1899	
George C. Wing Jr.	n/a	1901	1931	
George Otis Smith	1893	1903	1943	
Asher Hinds	1883	1904	1919	
Forrest Goodwin	1887	1908	1913	
Louise Helen Coburn	1876	1919	1930	
Herbert Lord	1884	1920	1925	
Franklin W. Johnson	1891	1920	1955	
Warren C. Philbrook	n/a	1923	1933	
Angier Goodwin	1902	1932	1934	
Bainbridge Colby	LL.D. 1933	1932	1942	
Marston Morse	1914	1933	1947	
Mary Louise Curtis Bok	n/a	1936	1939	
Carl Raymond Gray	n/a	1938	1939	
Guy Gabrielson	n/a	1941	1959	
Sumner Sewall	n/a	1945	1960	
Winthrop H. Smith	n/a	1946	1958	
J. Seelye Bixler	n/a	1957	1985	
Dwight E. Sargent	1939	1958		
Paul Donnelly Paganucci	n/a	1975	2001	
Robert E. L. Strider II	Litt.D. 1979	1979	2010	
Levin H. Campbell	n/a	1981	1999	
Robert E. Diamond, Jr.	1973, LL.D. 2008	2007		
Robert S. Gelbard	1964, LL.D. 2002	2008		
William R. Cotter	LL.D. 2000	2014	Life Trustee	
