= List of Colby College buildings =

Colby College overlooks the Kennebec River valley and city of Waterville.

In 2013 Colby became the fourth college in the country to achieve carbon neutrality. Colby uses 100-percent renewable electricity, has 12 LEED-certified buildings (other certifications pending), has geothermal heating and cooling in two buildings, and has a biomass plant that burns sustainably harvested wood to heat most campus buildings.

== Academic buildings ==
Building	Image	Constructed	Notes	Reference
Miller Library		1939	Miller Library is Colby's main library, which stands at the center of campus. Named for the parents of Merton L. Miller and designed by Jens Fredrick Larson, this building was modeled on Dartmouth College's Baker Library, which in turn was inspired in design by Independence Hall in Philadelphia. Miller Library's collection supports all curriculum areas and contains more than 600 print journals, more than 47,000 electronic journals, and domestic and international daily newspapers. It houses the college archives and Special Collections and is a repository for U.S. government and Maine state documents. Recent renovations to Miller Library (2012–15) were designed to create more study and office spaces, restore the library's “grand reading room,” and fashion a more impressive “entry sequence.”	
Lovejoy		1941	Named for Elijah Parish Lovejoy, an abolitionist and journalist who graduated from Colby's original campus, Waterville College, in 1826. The building is home to several classrooms and a lecture hall. Lovejoy houses the offices of the Departments of Classics, East Asian Studies, Philosophy, Religious Studies, foreign languages, and Information Technology Services.	
Runnals/Strider Theater		1942	Named for Robert E. L. Strider and Ninetta May Runnals, this building houses the Theater and Dance Department and the 262-seat Strider Theater. This intimate proscenium-style theater was constructed in 1976 and dedicated in 1977. The Cellar Theater, located below the main lobby in Runnals, is a black-box theater with seating for 55 people used for more intimate theater performances.	
Keyes		1950	Named after Martin L. Keyes this building houses science and chemistry laboratories, classrooms, faculty offices, support facilities, and the Paul J. Schupf Computational Laboratory. In 1978 a “greenhouse bridge" tying Keyes and Arey together was built, unifying Colby's science complex.	
Arey Life Sciences Building		1959	The Arey Life Sciences Building houses the Biology Department's offices, teaching and research laboratories, equipment, including transmission and scanning electron microscopes, and computer labs. The department also maintains the Webster Chester collection of biological specimens and models.	style="text-align:center;"
Bixler Art and Music Center		1959	Named after J. Seelye Bixler, this building is home to the Music and Art departments. The center contains classrooms, studios, practice rooms, Given Auditorium, an electronic music studio, the Art and Music Library, faculty offices, and is connected to the renowned Colby College Museum of Art. The building contains approximately 2,200 reference volumes, 10,000 scores, 30,000 monographs, 11,000 sound recordings, and 1,200 videos alongside study, research, listening, computing, viewing, and classroom space.	
Colby College Museum of Art		1959	Founded in 1959 and now comprising five wings, nearly 8,000 works and more than 38,000 square feet of exhibition space, the Colby College Museum of Art has built a collection that specializes in American and contemporary art with additional, select collections of Chinese antiquities and European paintings and works on paper. The museum serves as a teaching resource for Colby College and is a major cultural destination for the residents of Maine and visitors to the state.	
Seeley G. Mudd Science Building		1975	The building was constructed with a grant from the Seeley G. Mudd Foundation. It is home to the Geology and Physics departments and the Science, Technology, and Society Program. Geology maintains a rock and fossil specimen collection, X-ray diffractometer, scanning electron and high-resolution microscopes, magnetometers, and gravity meters. Physics students work in modern laboratories, including two atomic physics laboratories and a laboratory to study semiconductor materials. The Geology Department is the fourth oldest undergraduate program in the nation and is a repository for maps and publications of the United States Geological Survey.	
Collins Observatory		1988	The Collins Observatory, with its 400-power 14-inch Celestron telescope, was a gift from Anthony Cramer ’62 in memory of his classmate, Lawrence Walker Collins III. After its construction, the observatory became the domain of Murray Campbell, an astrophysicist who began working with students on infrared astronomy in 1981. It was upgraded with National Science Foundation grants that provided computerized controls and high-quality digital imaging capability in 1999, and an astronomy classroom was built adjacent to the observatory. Collins Observatory was moved to its current location, adjacent to the Colby Organic Garden, in 2016.	
Olin Science Building		1996	Colby was awarded the highly coveted F. W. Olin Foundation grant that provided funds for an entire furnished building. Olin houses collections supporting the departments of biology, chemistry, computer science, environmental science, geology, mathematics, physics and astronomy. It also a case-study classroom, teaching and research laboratories, a research greenhouse, group study areas for informal student-faculty discussions, and faculty offices. Olin used to include the 10,800-square-foot Olin Science Library, but in 2022 it was repurposed as offices for Greene's Artificial Intelligence and Entrepreneurship initiatives. A complete collection of U.S. topographic maps and groundwater-monitoring wells are located in the lower level.	
Diamond Social Sciences Building		2007	With the naming gift provided by Bob Diamond '73, the Diamond Building houses the Anthropology, Economics, Government, and Sociology departments, three interdisciplinary programs (African-American Studies, Environmental Studies, International Studies), and the Goldfarb Center for Public Affairs and Civic Engagement.	
Davis Science Center		2014	The Davis Science Center is named for the Shelby Cullom Davis Charitable Fund, and houses the departments of Computer Science, Mathematics and Statistics, and Psychology. The 36,400-square-foot building opened in 2014 and includes a robotics laboratory, a behavioral neuroscience research suite, and shared classrooms and computer labs. The building is LEED certified at the gold level.	

== Student life buildings ==
Building	Image	Constructed	Notes	Reference
Lorimer Chapel		1938	Named for George Horace Lorimer; the chapel was the first building constructed on the Mayflower Hill campus. Seating 650, Lorimer is a venue for religious services, lectures, and concerts. It houses the Office of the Dean of Religious and Spiritual Life as well as the small Rose Chapel. It also houses a Walcker Orgelbau pipe organ donated by the Andrew W. Mellon Foundation, The Nickerson Carillon tolls the hour from the chapel tower.	
Roberts Building		1938	The Roberts Building, known to students as “Bobs,” was named after Arthur J. Roberts. Roberts was the student union prior to the construction of Cotter Union. The building houses Roberts dining hall (renovated and expanded in 2006), offices of the Colby Echo, Colby's community radio station, WMHB, and the Pottery Club studio. Administrative departments include the Office of Human Resources and the Security Department. A major renovation in 2015 created student residence rooms on upper floors.	
Harold Alfond Athletic Center		1994	The Harold Alfond Athletic Center includes the 2,500-seat Wadsworth Gymnasium, the Alfond Ice Rink, and the field house, which encloses an eighth-mile track, four tennis courts, a batting cage, and a climbing wall. The complex includes a 25-yard by 25-meter swimming pool, five international-size squash courts, the Boulos Family Fitness Center, the Carl E. Nelson Physical Therapy Center, saunas, and studio space for yoga and group exercise.	
Garrison-Foster Building		1976	Named for Fay B. Garrison and Alfred D. Foster. The Garrison-Foster Building is home to the Health Center, Counseling Services, the Business Office, and Student Financial Services. Colby's Health Center is the only college health center in Maine accredited by the Accreditation Association for Ambulatory Health Care.	
Cotter Union		1985	Colby's student center, Cotter Union, includes Page Commons (for lectures, performances, and dances), Pulver Pavilion, the Colby Bookstore, the student post office, and the Office of Campus Life. The Pugh Center contains offices for multicultural organizations and meeting space for social and cultural programs. The Joseph Family Spa, a snack bar, is in Pulver Pavilion, and the Marchese Blue Light Pub is upstairs. Opened in 1985, renovated and expanded in 2007–08, Cotter Union is the center of social life on campus, where students meet and hang out. There is a large-screen television and an information desk in Pulver Pavilion, which is a crossroads for pedestrian traffic on campus.	
Klein Family Tennis Pavilion		1994	Built with donations from Jonas and Phyllis Klein and dedicated in 1994, the Tennis Pavilion sits in the center of the Alfond-Wales Tennis Courts (10 hard-surface courts) and provides a meeting room, bathroom, scoreboard, and veranda.	

== Administrative and support buildings ==
Building	Image	Constructed	Notes	Reference
Eustis Building		1959	The Eustis Administration Building houses the Office of the President and offices of Special Programs, dean of students, Dean of Faculty, Registrar, the Career Center, Off-Campus Studies, Vice President for Administration, Scheduling, and Financial Planning.	
Osborne House		1948	The Osborne House (formerly the President's House) sits above Mayflower Hill Drive at the south end of campus. It was a gift from the Averill family, first occupied by J. Seelye Bixler and family, and has been the home of Colby presidents since 1948. A weathervane adorning the garage's cupola bears a musical staff with the opening notes of Dr. Ermanno Comparetti's Mayflower Hill Concerto. The house was renamed Osborne House in 2017 to honor the family of Samuel Osborne who was born into slavery but made his way to Waterville. He worked as Colby's custodian for nearly 40 years. His daughter Marion was the first African-American woman to graduate for Colby, in 1900.	
Millett House		1965	The Millet Alumni house was named after Bill Millett ’25, who served as the alumni secretary of the College. A classical New England structure on the edge of campus, the house, modeled after the old library in nearby China Village, was purchased by the Alumni Council in 1966. It is used for College events and contains faculty offices.	
Physical Plant Department		1982	Responsible for buildings and grounds, the Physical Plant department has its headquarters, offices, shops, and storage in buildings at the north end of campus. PPD provides a wide range of services including housekeeping, grounds, carpentry, painting, plumbing, electrical, snow removal, grounds care, and utility generation and distribution. The department also provides a number of support services, such as moving, project planning, and cost estimating.	
Lunder House, Admissions		1992	Lunder House, located on the Colby Green, became the headquarters for the Admissions and Financial Aid Office in 1992. Prospective students begin at Lunder for tours, information sessions, and interviews.	
Schair-Swenson-Watson Alumni Center		2005	Opened in 2005, the Alumni Center is a central place on campus for alumni and has large and small function spaces for campus events and a small library on the first floor. The building also houses offices for College and Student Advancement and Communications. The center is LEED-silver certified and is heated and cooled with geothermal energy.	
Biomass Plant		2011	The 8,100-square-foot biomass plant on Campus Drive burns locally and sustainably sourced forest products with two 400-horsepower boilers, producing steam that is distributed underground to all parts of the campus. While oil is still used for backup and to augment biomass on the coldest winter days, biomass is the primary heat source. The steam plant also cogenerates about 10 percent of Colby's needed electricity using heat that would otherwise be wasted up the stack. The biomass plant is LEED certified at the gold level. The plant was designed by Rist, Frost, Schumway Engineering and ARC/Architectural Resources Cambridge.	
The Hill Guest House		1850	Originally the home of Josiah Morrell, the house stands behind the Colby tennis courts. In 1977 the house was named the Hill Family House in honor of James Frederick Hill of the Class of 1882, who was instrumental in the move to Mayflower Hill, and his descendants: Frederick Thayer Hill ’10, founder of nearby Thayer Hospital and a leader in the development of Colby’s summer medical programs; Howard Foster Hill ’18, and Kevin Hill ’50, who founded Colby’s summer postgraduate course in ophthalmology, later named for him. Presently the house is used to host guests of the College.	

== Residential buildings ==
Building	Image	Constructed	Notes	Reference
Coburn Hall and Mary Low Hall		1942	These residential buildings are named for Louise Helen Coburn and Mary Caffrey Low. Coburn and Mary Low are connected, housing single rooms, doubles, triples, and quads, a coffeehouse, and the Outing Club office. Renovated in 2001, Coburn Hall was also one of the first residence halls built on the Mayflower Hill campus. Mary Low houses the Mary Low Coffee House, which is a venue for concerts, international coffee hours, and informal gatherings.	
Foss Residence and Dining Hall and Woodman Hall		1952	Foss and Woodman residence halls are connected and house singles, doubles, triples, quads, and suites. Foss was expanded and renovated in 1999 and it is home to Foss dining hall, known for vegetarian and international fare.	
Dana Residence and Dining Hall		1966	Built in 1966 and extensively remodeled in 1999, Dana is the largest residence hall at Colby. Dana dining hall, on the ground floor, is the largest of three campus dining halls and features cooking stations, made-to-order sandwiches, pizza, and a grill.	
The Heights		1981	The Heights is set into the hillside behind Lorimer Chapel, its terraced design affords most rooms views of the surrounding woods. It has four-person suites, singles, and doubles. The Heights also features a large community room, lounges, and study areas throughout the building.	
AMS (Anthony, Mitchell, Schupf)		1997	Anthony-Mitchell-Schupf provides singles, double, and group suites with private bathrooms, small lounges, and a large common social space. A function room and adjacent patio provide event space with a sound system and a kitchenette. There is also a 1,600-square-foot faculty apartment. The complex houses 141 students and was named for Edson Mitchell '75, Paul J. Schupf H '91, and Robert N. Anthony '38.	
Harold and Bibby Alfond Senior Residence Complex		1999	Named for philanthropist Harold Alfond and his wife. Located in the woods near the highest point of Mayflower Hill, the Senior Apartments are connected to campus but secluded and with a separate driveway. Designed as an on-campus choice for seniors who desire greater autonomy and independence, the Alfond apartments house 107 seniors in suites for four, five, or six individuals. Each suite has a private bathroom and fully equipped kitchen. Small patios and a large common room with a kitchen and sound system provide space for social gatherings.	

=== Hillside ===
Designed by Benjamin C. Thompson, the Hillside complex is a network of five interconnected dorms west of Lorimer Chapel set in a stand of white birch and pine trees. Hillside halls have a lounge on every floor.

Building	Image	Constructed	Notes	Reference
Leonard Hall		1967	Named for Neil F. Leonard, Class of 1921, former college trustee.	
Marriner Hall		1967	Dormitory named for Ernest Marriner, Class of 1913, former Dean of Faculty.	
Sturtevant Hall		1967	Dormitory named for Reginald H. Sturtevant, Class of 1921, former college trustee.	
Taylor Hall		1967	Dormitory named for Julian Taylor, longest-serving faculty at the time.	
Williams Hall		1967	Williams was formerly the Kappa Delta Rho fraternity house.	

=== The Quad ===
Building	Image	Constructed	Notes	Reference
Averill Hall		1942	Named for George Averill, M.D., a trustee and chair of the board in the first half of the 20th century, who gave more than $1 million to help build the new campus and move the college to Mayflower Hill. Originally constructed as a male dorm in 1942, the building became co-ed in 1972. In the fall of 1974, Averill Hall became the first quiet dorm at Colby. It was also among the first dormitories to be renovated in 1982.	
Johnson Hall		1950	Named after Franklin Winslow Johnson, the 15th president of Colby College. Located at the end of Roberts Row and adjacent to Miller Library, Johnson residence hall has a lounge and study room shared by its residents.	
East Quad		1946	Residence hall on the northeast side of Miller Library, renovated in 1998. The three wings of East Quad are named for three presidents of the college: Albion Woodbury Small, James Tift Champlin, and Nathaniel Butler Jr.	
West Quad		1946	Residence hall on the northwest side of Miller Library, renovated 1998. The three wings of West Quad are named for three presidents of the college: Henry Ephraim Robins, Jeremiah Chaplin and George Dana Boardman Pepper.	

=== Roberts Row ===
On Alumni Weekend (June 8, 1985), the buildings of "Fraternity Row" were rededicated and renamed with recommendations of their former occupants.

Building	Image	Constructed	Notes	Reference
Drummond Hall		1950	Named after Josiah Hayden Drummond, Class of 1846. One of several small residence halls on Roberts Row, Drummond was the former Delta Kappa Epsilon fraternity house. It was renovated and expanded in the summer of 2013 and is LEED certified at the gold level.	
Goddard-Hodgkins Hall		1950	Named after Cecil Goddard '29 and Theodore Hodgkins '25. Known as Go-Ho by students, it is the former Alpha Tau Omega fraternity house. It was renovated and expanded in 2010 and is a LEED-gold-certified building.	
Pierce Hall		1950	Named after T. Raymond Pierce, Class of 1898, formerly the Zeta Psi fraternity house. It was renovated in 2008 and received LEED-gold certification for sustainability.	
Piper Hall		1950	Named after Wilson C. Piper '39. Renovated in 2013, Piper was formerly the Delta Upsilon fraternity house. Piper is LEED certified at the gold level.	
Treworgy Hall		1950	Named after Charles Treworgy '22, a student who perished in the fire that destroyed the Lambda Chi Alpha house on the old campus in 1922. Renovated in 2011, Treworgy is LEED-gold certified.	
Grossman Hall		1951	Named after Nissie Grossman '32 and originally constructed for the Tau Delta Phi fraternity. Grossman is currently being expanded and renovated to become Colby's Center for Postgraduate Success, expected to be completed by the fall of 2017.	
Perkins-Wilson Hall		1951	Named after Norman C. Perkins and W. Malcolm Wilson; known as Pe-Wi by students. Perkins-Wilson was formerly the Phi Delta Theta fraternity house. It was renovated in 2008 and received LEED-gold certification for sustainability.	

== Other campus facilities ==
Building	Image	Constructed	Notes	Reference
Colby Hume Center		Donated 1991	The Colby Hume Center is private property owned by Dr. Alan Hume but open to use for college students. The property was given to Colby in 1991 by Alan and Dorothy Hume, who reside there in a private home. The Hume Center is a 10-acre parcel of land, including some 450 feet of lakefront, seven miles from the campus on the east shore of Messalonskee Lake (also known as Snow Pond) in Sidney, Maine. It is the home of the crew program, the college's blacksmithing course, and numerous other outbuildings.	
The Colby Outing Club Cabin		2010	The Colby Outing Club Cabin is owned by the Colby Outing Club and reserved for the use of Colby students and faculty. It is located on the shore of Great Pond.	
The Perkins Arboretum		1946	This 128-acre preserve was established in 1946, and later dedicated to the memory of Professor Edward Henry Perkins and his wife. Professor Perkins was an outdoor enthusiast and chairman of the Department of Geology for 16 years until his death in 1936. Mrs. Perkins was a member of the college staff for 18 years. The arboretum is used for research and recreation. The Campbell Cross Country Running Trails run through this preserved wooded land, as do numerous other walking trails and paths. In addition to the arboretum, the entire Colby campus was designated a State Wildlife Preserve by the Maine Legislature in 1969.	
Colby Organic Garden		2007	In the fall of 2007, a group of students started a small garden on a plot off of Washington Street and began the Colby student garden. As the project spread, students secured a second garden plot as well as an important partnership with the Biology Department and Dining Services. The student garden was relocated to its current spot on Runnals Hill in the spring of 2009, allowing for easier access to water and the general campus. Collaborative efforts between the Environmental Studies Advisory Group, Dining Services, Biology, Environmental Studies, Summer Programs, and the Physical Plant Departments led to the construction of a shed for the garden, establishment of water lines, and creation of the student summer garden intern position.	
Johnson Pond		1948	Originally called College Pond and later renamed after Franklin W. Johnson, 15th president of the college, Johnson Pond has been a cornerstone of the campus, enjoyed by students in all seasons. A natural buffer strip is maintained around the pond to help as a filter and no fertilizers are used around the pond itself. The pond is periodically inspected by an aquatic biologist as well as routinely tested for nutrient levels.	
Quarry Road Recreation Area		1962	Formerly the Colby Ski Hill, opened in the 1960s, it was recently gifted to a nonprofit organization and re-purposed as the Quarry Road Recreation Area, retained for use by the college. Generous grants from many benefactors, including Colby, have allowed Waterville's recreation area to build trails for a range of activities including hiking, biking, and skiing. Snow-making facilities allow for competitive Nordic skiing races.	

== Original campus ==
Building	Image	Constructed	Notes	Reference
South College Hall		1821	The first building to be constructed on Colby's old campus in downtown Waterville so that classes could be moved out of Jeremiah Chaplin's rented house. The building included 18 rooms and a chapel, at a time when only three students had newly enrolled.	
North College		1822	The second building constructed at Colby's original campus. It was a four-story, Federal-style brick structure, 80 by 40 feet. It included 32 double student rooms, recitation halls, and a library.	
Champlin Hall		1836	Named for the seventh president of the college, James Tift Champlin, with funds raised by President Rufus Babcock, commonly referred to as Champlin Hall. Included a chapel and recitation rooms.	
Memorial Hall		1869	Built as a memorial to the Colby men who died in the Civil War and designed by Alexander Rice Esty.	
Coburn Hall		1872	The first building at the college devoted to the sciences. Built during the presidency of James Tift Champlin and named for Abner Coburn.	
Gymnasium		1869	Trustees appropriated $1,200 for the construction of a permanent gymnasium, the first building on campus dedicated solely to athletic pursuits. The new gym served mostly as a space for students to participate in gymnastics and calisthenics.	
Shannon Observatory		1889	Col. Richard Cutts Shannon, Class of 1862, funded a workplace for the physicist William Rogers, who agreed to come to Waterville from his position at Harvard. The observatory was built to Rogers's specifications and included a Troughton & Simms telescope, storage batteries, and a generator, which supplied electric light to College buildings in the 1890s.	
Chemical Hall		1899	Chemical Hall was the home of chemistry lectures and labs, the president's office, and a faculty meeting room.	
Foss Hall		1904	Designed by John Calvin Stevens for use as the women's dormitory, including dorm rooms, a dining hall, a gym, and meeting rooms.	
Roberts Hall		1911	Named for Colby's 14th president, Arthur J. Roberts, who commissioned its construction. Built as a dormitory to accommodate the growing student population.	
Hedman Hall		1915	Named for Colby Professor of Romance Languages John Hedman and built as a dormitory.	
