= Herbert Elijah Wadsworth =

American businessman (1868–1937)

- Born: October 25, 1868; Livermore Falls, Maine
- Died: August 25, 1937 (aged 68)
- Education: Hebron Academy, Coburn Classical Institute, Colby College

Herbert Elijah Wadsworth (October 25, 1868 - August 25, 1937) was a businessman, politician, and philanthropist in Winslow, Maine. He was president of the oilcloth company Wadsworth and Woodman.

== Personal ==
Wadsworth was born on October 25, 1868, in Livermore Falls, Maine, to Elijah Wadsworth and Ruth Ann Record. He was educated first at Hebron Academy, then at the Coburn Classical Institute. He graduated from Colby College in 1892, where he was a member of Delta Kappa Epsilon.

== Career ==
He was president of Wadsworth and Woodman Company in Winslow, Maine from 1905 to 1935. He was a director of the Charles M. Bailey Public Library. He served as a Maine State Representative and Senator, and was the chair of the Appropriations and Financial Affairs Committee.

He was the Chair of the Colby College Board of Trustees from 1926 to 1934. Upon his death, he sponsored an endowed professorship at Colby, where a gymnasium is named in his honor.
