= Beniah Longley Whitman =

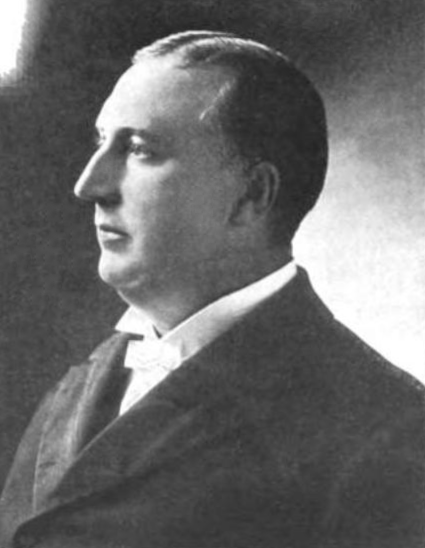

11th President of Colby College
- In office 1892–1895
- Preceded by: Albion Woodbury Small
- Succeeded by: Nathaniel Butler Jr.

President of George Washington University

Personal details
- Born: November 21, 1862 Wilmot, Nova Scotia, Canada
- Died: November 27, 1911 (aged 49) Seattle, Washington, U.S.
- Education: Brown University

Rev. Beniah Longley Whitman (also spelled Benaiah; November 21, 1862 – November 27, 1911) was the 11th president of Colby College, and later Columbian College (now George Washington University).

== Life ==
Beniah Longley Whitman was born in Wilmot, Nova Scotia on November 21, 1962. He prepared for college at the Worcester Academy in Worcester, Massachusetts. He graduated from Brown University in the class of 1887, with a B.A. degree, and received an M.A. degree in 1890. He received the honorary degree of D.D. from Bowdoin College in 1894; the degree of LL.D. from Howard University in 1899, and from Furman University in 1906.

He was a lecturer at Bucknell University, 1900–07; trustee of Newton Theological Institution (now the Andover Newton Theological School), 1894-02; and of the Crozer Theological Seminary, 1901–08; and President of the American Baptist Historical Society, 1900–07. He was a member of the Delta Upsilon fraternity and of Phi Beta Kappa.

He married Mary J. Scott of Newton, Massachusetts on December 6, 1888, and they had four children. He was pastor of the Free Street Baptist Church, Portland, Maine, 1890–92; President of Colby College, 1892–95; President of Columbian, now George Washington University, 1895-1900; pastor of the Fifth Baptist Church, Philadelphia, Pennsylvania, 1900–07; and First Baptist Church, Seattle, Washington, from 1908 until his death in 1911.

== Publications ==
- Ideals in Education (1892)
- Elements of Ethics (1893)
- Elements of Sociology (1894)
- Elements of Political Science (1899)
- Outlines of Political History (1900)
