= The Colby Echo =

Colby College student newspaper

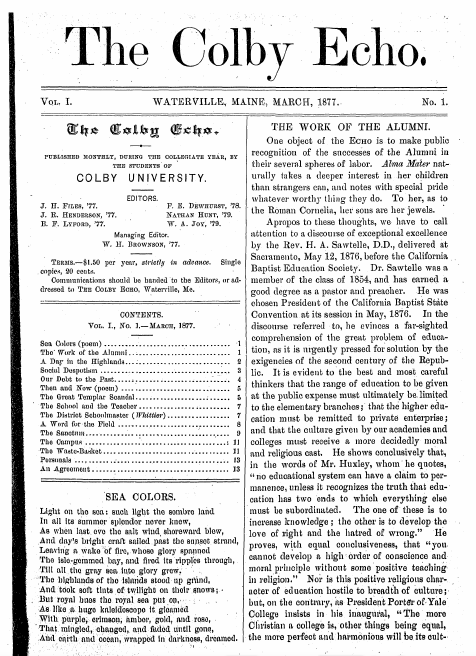
- First Edition of The Colby Echo, 1877
- Type: Weekly student newspaper
- Format: Tabloid
- Editor-in-chief: Peg Schreiner and Will Walkey
- Staff writers: 22
- Founded: 1877
- Headquarters: Roberts Hall; 4000 Mayflower Hill; Waterville, Maine
- Circulation: 1,000
- Price: Free on the Colby College campus $100/year subscription
- Website: colbyecho.news

The Colby Echo, established in 1877, is the weekly student newspaper of Colby College in Waterville, Maine.

The Colby Echo staff currently consists of 20 editors, who are responsible for assigning and writing articles, overseeing the production process and maintaining the Echo’s online presence. The Colby Echo editors also assign weekly articles to a team of 15 news staff writers. Students interested in contributing to the paper are encouraged to contact the editor(s) of the section(s) they are interested in working for in order to learn more. A current Editorial Board roster can be found at: https://medium.com/colby-echo/about

== Circulation and Distribution ==
The Colby Echo is published every Wednesday that the College is in session, with 1,300 copies printed each week. A full year subscription costs $60. The paper is available at many locations throughout campus, including the three dining halls, the Street in Miller Library, Pulver Pavilion, the Diamond building, the alumni center, the admissions building and the athletic center. The Colby Echo is also distributed to several businesses in Waterville, including Jokas’ Discount Beverages, Jorgenson’s Café and the Railroad Square Cinema.

Archives dating from the March 1877 issue to the May 2006 issue are available online. Hard copies are accessible in the Miller Library special collections.

== History ==
The Colby Echo was first published on March 1, 1877. As editors noted in this first issue, “[y]ears ago, college journalism was unknown; now every college of size and influence has its paper—some, several. Colby had nothing of the sort, except the yearly Oracle.” The paper, then a monthly publication, was designed to serve as “an Echo of the ideas, views and opinions of the students; a conductor to dissipate the pent-up electricity of college intellect, without any disastrous explosion. College spirit had begun to demand such a paper, and sooner or later it was bound to be established."

After a Publishing Association had been formed, committee members worked on choosing a name for the paper, and were especially drawn to either “Colbiensis” or “Colby Echo.” The ultimately selected “Colby Echo” because they found it unique. Unbeknown to the Colby editors, the College of the City of New York had created its own paper, The College Echo, a few months earlier. In an issue printed in May 1877, the Colby editors explain that they “did not ascertain until too late to make a change in the name, or [they] certainly should have done so, recognizing the prior right of [their] brothers of the College Echo to the name.” However, they explain, they believe the decisions must have been “nearly simultaneous.” Upon learning of the similar names, the College Echo then wrote to the Colby editors a “gentlemanly note,” leading the Colby editors to request that “all exchanges, in mentioning us, to do so always as The Colby Echo, and the other as The Echo, or The College Echo.”

From the beginning, editors of The Colby Echo emphasized the paper’s collective role within the College community. “The paper is not by any means the property of a firm of half-a-dozen men...who are elected editors.... But it belongs to the whole College, and, as such, each student should take pride in it and feel bound to do all that he can towards sustaining it,” the editors wrote in April 1877.

The Colby Echo quickly “ceased to be an experiment,” and became “regarded as one of the College fixtures.” It also began to provide a means for alumni to stay up-to-date on College events. In the October 1877 issue, editors noted that for some alumni, the Echo is “the only link which connects you to your Alma Mater...we are sure the Echo will be to you a welcome messenger—bearing good news, awakening old and fond recollections, and bringing you back to the scenes of your College days.”

By the twentieth century, editors began to implement many influential changes on the Hill, as former college official Earl Smith describes in his book, Mayflower Hill: A History of Colby College. Smith notes a number of instances in which Echo editors became active, both politically and within their own campus community.

After listening to former President William Taft speak at the Waterville Opera House in 1917, editors were so taken by Taft’s “message of patriotism and warnings of an inevitable war” that they “promptly urged the formation of a campus military company.”

Joseph Coburn Smith ’24 “first proposed that the College adopt the white mule as its rather odd mascot,” while serving as the newspaper’s editor-in-chief.

In 1936, the Echo suddenly became Maine’s first Democratic newspaper when Roland Gammon ’37 praised Roosevelt’s New Deal. “His editorial raging against ‘the outmoded Republican No-Deal…with its laissez-faire in business and splendid isolation of foreign affairs’ created a firestorm. The local Sentinel and the Portland Press Herald called for gagging the upstart editor. Professors Galen Eustis and Curtis Morrow called for his ‘suppression or expulsion.’ However, Frank Johnson, then the president of the College, explained to Gammon that ‘free speech and free press are as much a Colby tradition as a Constitutional guarantee.’”

During the mid-twentieth century, “responding to criticism that students were afraid to speak out, the newspaper created an ‘open-forum’ column and invited readers to prove critics wrong.”

Following the Watergate scandal, “the Echo joined eighty-four other college newspapers in calling for Nixon’s impeachment. ‘He is no longer a legitimate leader,’ the editorial said. ‘No amount of double-talk or political timidity can obscure this fact.’”

After the draft was reorganized in 1967, “Registrar George Coleman explained the new rules in the Echo, where editorials reflected the sullen mood of students and acknowledged there was no sign of the kind of patriotism that had ignited past generations in time of war.”

In 1970, the Echo supported the “Chapel 18” incident—when members of the Student Organization for Black Unity (SOBU) went into Lorimer Chapel “reciting five ‘demands’” aimed at increasing the College’s black student population—and said that “the protest merely ‘dramatized the need for rapid action on black problems’”

== Notable Echo Alumni ==
- Doris Kearns Goodwin (1964) - historian, political analyst, biographer. Winner of 1995 Pulitzer Prize in History, author of No Ordinary Time, The Fitzgeralds and the Kennedys, Wait ‘Till Next Year, Lyndon Johnson and the American Dream
- Jane Brox (1978) - recipient, 1996 L. L. Winship/PEN New England Award for the best book by a New England author; Here and Nowhere Else: Late Seasons of a Farm and Its Family
- Alan Taylor (1977) - historian, professor, winner of the 1996 Pulitzer Prize in History, William Cooper's Town: Power and Persuasion on the Frontier of the Early American Republic
- Annie Proulx (1957) - winner, 1994 Pulitzer Prize in Fiction; Winner, 1993 National Book Award for Fiction; Winner of the Irish Times International Fiction Prize,
- Matt Apuzzo (2000) - former editor-in-chief and Pulitzer Prize winning journalist for The New York Times
