= Charles Lincoln White =

American college president

Rev. Charles Lincoln White
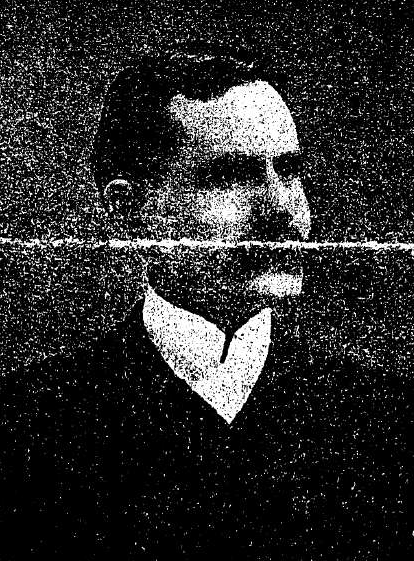

13th President of Colby College
- In office 1901–1908
- Preceded by: Nathaniel J. Butler
- Succeeded by: Arthur J. Roberts

Personal details
- Born: January 22, 1863 Nashua, New Hampshire, U.S.
- Died: 1941 (aged 77–78) Hampton Falls, New Hampshire, U.S.
- Spouse(s): Margaret Donalda Dodge (m. 1891; died 1928) Annie H P White (m. 1930)
- Children: Jessie Dodge, Harriet Dodge, Katharine Dodge, Clarissa Dodge, Mary Dodge
- Education: Brown University
- Profession: Pastor

Charles Lincoln White (January 22, 1863 – 1941) was the 13th president of Colby College, Maine, United States, from 1901 to 1908.

== Early life ==
White was born in Nashua, New Hampshire, to George and Harriet Richardson White. He was educated at Woburn High School and graduated from Brown University in 1887 where he was a member of Delta Upsilon, and Newton Theological Institution in 1889.

== Career ==
He was pastor at Somersworth Baptist Church, New Hampshire, from 1890 to 1894, and the First Church of Nashua from 1894 to 1900.

== Presidency ==
He was called to the presidency of Colby College in June 1901, having served as the general secretary of the New Hampshire Baptist Convention the year previous. He remained at the head of the college until 1908.

Foss Dining Hall was built in 1904, named after Eliza Foss Dexter, from whom he coaxed the money.

== Post-presidency ==
He received the degree of D. D. from Bowdoin College in 1902. After his presidency, he moved to Brooklyn, New York, with his family and worked as a manuscript secretary.

== Published works ==
- Charles Lincoln White (1915). The Churches at Work. Smith & Lamar. (still in print)
- —— (1916). The Children of the Lighthouse. Illustrated by H. B. Dummer. Association Press.
- —— (1916). Lincoln Dodge, Layman (3rd ed.). American Baptist Pub. Society.
- —— (1932). A century of faith. Pub. for the American Baptist home mission society by the Judson Press.
