= George Dana Boardman Pepper =

American academic administrator (1833–1913)

George D. B. Pepper

9th President of Colby College
- In office 1882–1889
- Preceded by: Henry Ephraim Robins
- Succeeded by: Albion Woodbury Small

Personal details
- Born: February 5, 1833 Ware, Massachusetts
- Died: January 30, 1913 (aged 79) Waterville, Maine
- Education: Amherst College

George Dana Boardman Pepper (February 5, 1833 – January 30, 1913) was an American academic administrator who served as the 9th president of Colby College from 1882 to 1889.

== Early life and education ==
Pepper was born in Ware, Massachusetts, the youngest of five children. He attended the Williston Seminary (now called the Williston Northampton School) for three years before entering Amherst College at the age of 21 in 1853. In 1857, he attended the Andover Theological Seminary (now called the Andover Newton Theological School).

== Career ==
He was hired as the pastor of the First Baptist Church in Waterville, Maine in 1860, and married Annie Grassie in the same year. In 1865 he was called to the chair of Church History in Newton, Massachusetts. In 1867, he accepted the chair of Systematic Theology at the Crozer Theological Seminary, where he remained for 15 years. In 1882 he was called to the presidency of Colby College as a result of acquaintances he had made during his time in Waterville. Notably, his essay "The School and the Church" reads in part "This shows that we must keep the church in schools." He left in 1889 for health reasons, but returned in 1892 as the chair of Biblical Literature. In 1900, he retired for the last time on account of his failing health, and remained in Waterville with his wife. His last public appearance was the Commencement Dinner of 1912.

The average attendance at Colby during Pepper's tenure was around 120. At the time of Pepper's retirement, the school's endowment funds had risen to $505,767. His resignation was accompanied by a recommendation that Albion Woodbury Small be appointed his successor.

During his career, Pepper received a handful of honorary degrees, including a D.D. from Amherst College, Brown University, and Colby College, and a LL.D. from the University at Lewisburg (now Bucknell University) and Colby College.

== Publishings ==
- “Outlines of Theology.” Manuscript on paper. Upland, PA, 1871, 276pp.
