= Henry Ephraim Robins =

American college president (1827–1917)

8th President of Colby College
- In office 1873–1882
- Preceded by: James Tift Champlin
- Succeeded by: George Dana Boardman Pepper

Personal details
- Born: September 30, 1827 Hartford, Connecticut, U.S.
- Died: April 23, 1917 (aged 89) Greenfield, Massachusetts, U.S.

Henry Ephraim Robins (1827–1917) was the eighth President of Colby College, Maine, United States, from 1873 to 1882.

== Early life ==
Henry Ephraim Robins was born in Hartford, Connecticut on September 30, 1827. He pursued studies at the Suffield Literary Institute and the Fairmount Theological Seminary in Kentucky. He was a cousin of actress and author Elizabeth Robins and Presidential Advisor Raymond Robins. In her diary, Elizabeth records meeting "Cousin Henry" and his wife Cordelia Ewell (Nott) on December 21, 1880.

He authored theological books such as "Ethics of the Christian Life" and wrote for Christian journals.<ref.</ref>

He died at his daughter's home in Greenfield, Massachusetts, on April 23, 1917. He is buried at Mount Hope Cemetery in Rochester, New York.

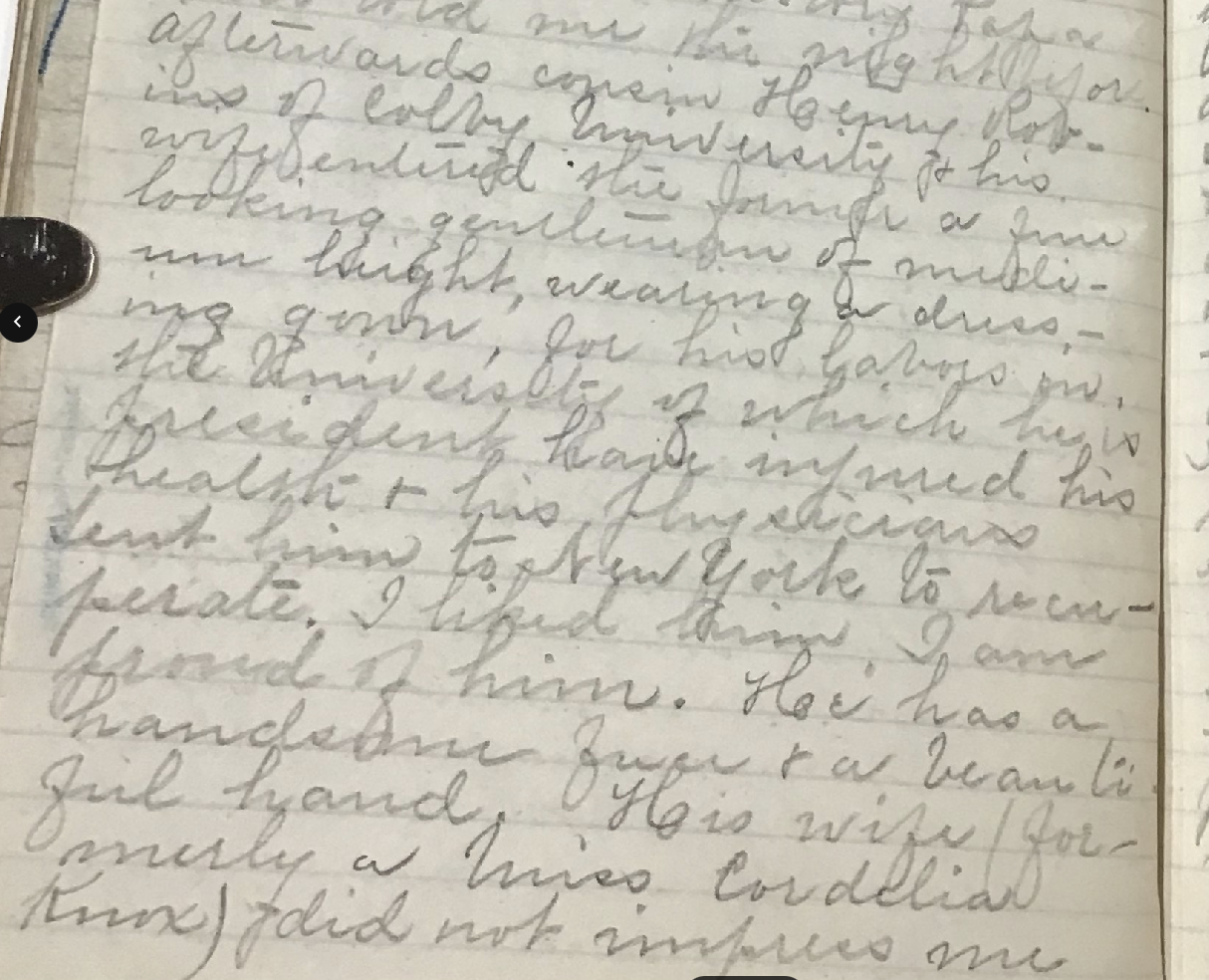
Elizabeth Robins diary entry on meeting Cousin Henry

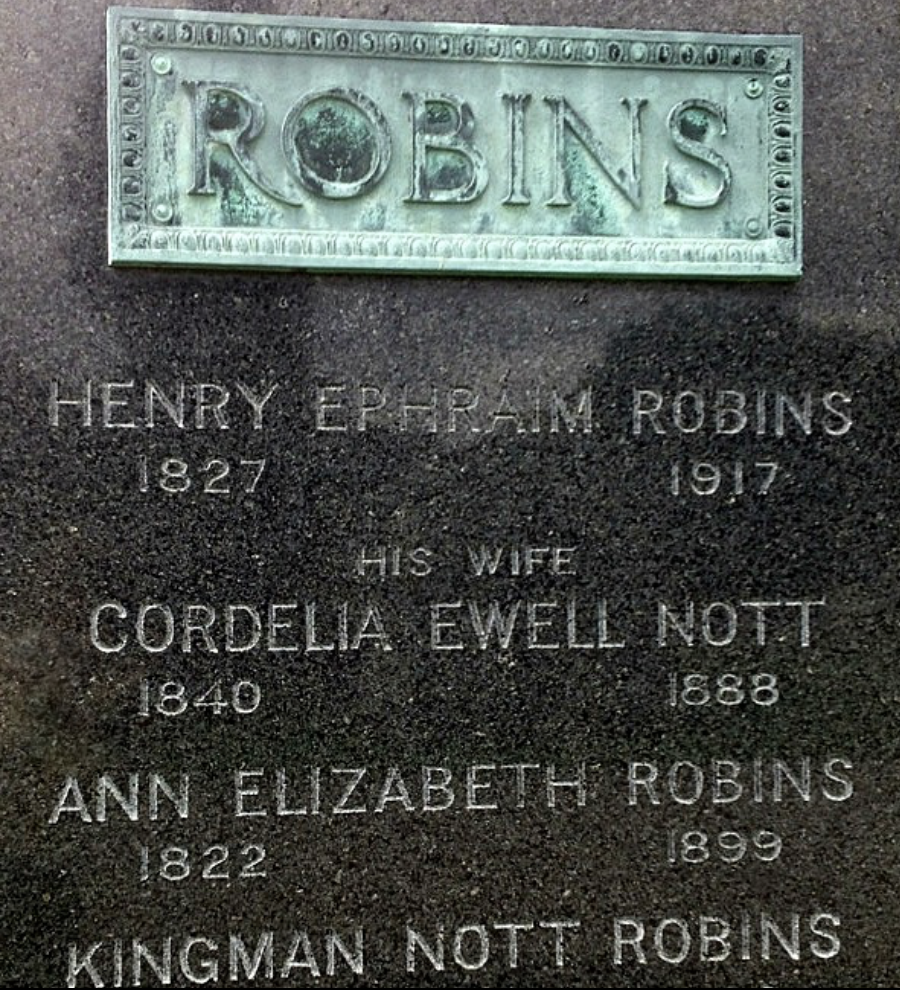
