= David Greene (university administrator) =

20th president of Colby College, Maine

20th President of Colby College
- Incumbent
- Assumed office July 1, 2014
- Preceded by: William Adams

Personal details
- Born: 1963 (age 62–63) Worcester, Massachusetts, U.S.
- Education: Hamilton College (BA); Harvard University (MA, MA, PhD)

David Greene (born 1963) is an American social planner who has been the 20th president of Colby College since 2014. Greene was installed as president on July 1, 2014, and succeeded William Adams, who had been president since 2000.

== Early life and education ==
Greene grew up in Worcester, Massachusetts, and graduated from Doherty Memorial High School. He graduated from Hamilton College with a B.A. in history in 1985, and went on to receive an M.A. in human development from Harvard University in 1991. In 1994, Greene earned an M.A. in administration, planning, and social policy from Harvard as well as a Ph.D. in the same specialization at Harvard in 2002.

Greene is one of three members of the same family to hold the role of university President: his father, Richard Greene, served as president at St. Thomas University in Miami, Florida, and at Goddard College in Plainfield, Vermont. His brother, Thomas Greene, founded the Vermont College of Fine Arts in 2008.

== Career ==
Greene began his career in college administration at Wells College in 1987 as assistant dean of students and later as associate dean of admissions. From 1991 to 1993, he worked as a president's assistant at Hartnell College. Starting in 1996, Greene served as assistant to Ruth Simmons when she worked as president of Smith College. Greene continued to work with Simmons at Brown University in Providence, Rhode Island, when she became president in 2001 and in 2004, Greene was promoted to vice president for campus life and student services. After Brown University, Greene joined the University of Chicago and in 2006, Greene was promoted to executive vice president in charge of financial strategy and fundraising, real estate development, campus master planning, and external relations.

Under Greene's administration, Colby College has engaged in an ongoing revitalization of Waterville, ME, investing $85 million in local civic projects under the theory that through a partnership between the town and the college, both will flourish by attracting more students to the town, which will then have jobs they can fill upon graduation. Colby College has also added artificial intelligence (AI) to the list of course offerings to begin to build a “moral foundation into algorithms” by combining artificial intelligence courses with liberal arts programs and has been recognized as one of the first liberal arts schools to do so.

Governor Janet Mills stated “Colby’s investment in our shared community reflects its commitment to its students and our state and is a great example of how we can revitalize our communities, strengthen local talent, expand our workforce, and strengthen our economy.”

Greene stated that “using the arts as a centerpiece is one way for Waterville to attract new residents and encourage faculty to settle here.”

Greene initiated the Colby fundraising initiative “Dare Northward” in 2017. The initiative had a goal of raising $750,000,000. It raised that amount by 2023. The target was raised to $1,000,000,000, and that was reached in 2025, exceeding all expectations.

== Personal life ==
Greene is married with three children.
