= J. Seelye Bixler =

Julius Seelye Bixler

16th President of Colby College
- In office 1942–1960
- Preceded by: Franklin W. Johnson
- Succeeded by: Robert E. L. Strider

Personal details
- Born: April 4, 1894 New London, Connecticut
- Died: March 28, 1985 (aged 90) Weston, Massachusetts
- Education: Amherst College, Yale University

Julius Seelye Bixler (April 4, 1894 – March 28, 1985) was the 16th President of Colby College, Maine, United States, from 1942–1960.

== Early life ==
Born Julius Seelye Bixler in New London, CT, to James William Bixler and Elizabeth J. Seelye Bixler. His father was a clergyman who was elected to the New Hampshire House of Representatives and Senate. His maternal grandfather was Julius Hawley Seelye, president of Amherst College from 1876–90, and his grand-uncle was Laurenus Clark Seelye, the first president of Smith College.

J. Seelye Bixler attended the Classical High in New London, where he played football. He matriculated at Amherst College with the class of 1916, where he was elected to Phi Beta Kappa, the senior honorary society "Scarab," won first prize in the commencement speaking contest, was song leader for his class. He also was a member of the Alpha Delta Phi fraternity.

After his graduation from Amherst in 1916, he became an instructor of Latin and English at The American College in Madurai, India, for a year, before returning to the States to attend Union Theological Seminary in the City of New York. During World War I, he served in the army until December 1918. He soon returned to Amherst College for graduate study in the spring of 1919, and the following school year served as Director of Religious Activities, while completing the requirements for an MA, which he received from Amherst in 1920.

In 1920 Bixler became a lecturer at the American University of Beirut, at that time located in the country of Syria. In 1922, he returned to the United States to study at Yale University, and the following year conducted research at Harvard University for his thesis on William James before returning to Yale to receive his Ph.D. in 1924.

== Career ==
In 1924 he became a member of the Smith College faculty, acting as assistant professor of religion and biblical literature from 1924 to 1925, associate professor of religion and biblical literature from 1925 to 1929, and professor of religion and biblical literature from 1929 to 1933. From 1928 to 1929, Bixler took a leave of absence and conducted research at the University of Freiberg, Germany.

In 1933, he became Bussey Professor of Theology at Harvard, a position that he held until 1942, when he accepted the position of President of Colby College. As president of Colby College, his achievements included relocating the campus from downtown Waterville to a 900-acre site on the edge of the town, as well as building 27 new campus buildings, more than doubling the numbers of faculty and students, increasing the endowment from $1 million to $8.5 million, and increasing the annual budget from $400,000 to $2.5 million. He also founded both the art and music departments.

After stepping down from his position of president in 1960, Bixler became a visiting lecturer for the State Department and also helped to set up a liberal arts program at Thammasat University in Bangkok in 1962. He has published extensively, including six books, numerous pamphlets and brochures, essays, contributions to books and periodicals.

== Awards and honors ==
The Bixler Art and Music building at Colby is named in his memory. Bixler received honorary degrees from many institutions: a D.D. from Amherst College; L.H.D.s from Union College, Wesleyan College, Bates College and Harvard University; LL.D. from the University of Maine, Brown University, Bowdoin College and Colby College; a D.C.L. from Acadia University in Nova Scotia; and a LITT.D. from American International College.

== Personal life ==
In September 1917 he married Mary Harrison Thayer, Smith College class of 1917, the daughter of Hiram Harrison Thayer and Harriet A (Carpenter), of Westfield. They had four daughters.

Bixler died of pneumonia at the age of 90 at his daughter's home in Weston, MA.

== Publications ==
- Bixler, Julius Seelye (1926). Religion in the Philosophy of William James. Marshall Jones Company. OCLC 609890039.
- Bixler, Julius Seelye (1931). Immortality and the Present Mood. Harvard University Press. OCLC 4564571.
- Bixler, Julius Seelye (1939). Religion for Free Minds. Harper and Brothers. OCLC 608724808.
- Bixler, Julius Seelye (1946). Conversations with an Unrepentant Liberal. Yale University Press. OCLC 1005226.
- Bixler, Julius Seelye (1951). A Faith that Fulfills. Harper and Brothers. OCLC 2779275.
- Bixler, Julius Seelye (1952). Education for adversity. Harvard University Press. OCLC 603178207.
- Bixler, Julius Seelye (1953). Colby College (1813-1953); a venture of faith. Newcomen Society in North American. OCLC 924564.
- Bixler, Julius Seelye (1961). In search of God and immortality. Beacon Press. OCLC 555609740.
