= Robert E. L. Strider =

American academic (1917–2010)

17th President of Colby College
- In office 1960–1979
- Preceded by: J. Seelye Bixler
- Succeeded by: William R. Cotter

Personal details
- Born: April 8, 1917 Wheeling, West Virginia, U.S.
- Died: November 28, 2010 (aged 93) Jamaica Plain, Massachusetts, U.S.
- Education: Harvard University (AB, PhD)

Robert E. L. Strider (April 8, 1917 – November 28, 2010) was the 17th President of Colby College from 1960 to 1979.

== Early life ==
Born in Wheeling, West Virginia, Strider was the son of the Rev. Robert E.L. Strider, later the third bishop of the Diocese of West Virginia; and Mary Holroyd Strider, who died at his birth. He was valedictorian of his class at the Linsly Military Institute, going on to study at Episcopal High School in Alexandria, Virginia, before entering Harvard University. He graduated, cum laude, in 1939.

At the onset of World War II, Strider served as an ensign and then lieutenant in Navy communications, stationed in Washington, D.C. After his discharge, in 1946 he joined the English department at Connecticut College, and completed his Harvard doctorate in 1950.

== Presidency at Colby ==
Strider came to Colby in 1957 as dean of faculty, and in 1960, at the age of 42, succeeded Julius Seelye Bixler as Colby's 17th president. During his Colby presidency, he prevailed as an academic leader and introduced a number of lasting curricular innovations, including the now widely imitated January Program of Independent Study. He led the college to residential co-education and broadened the curriculum to include foreign study opportunities, interdisciplinary studies and non-Western and black studies. In 1962, the Ford Foundation chose Colby as one of 18 "centers of academic excellence" and awarded the college a two-for-one matching grant of $1.8 million, an amount nearly six times greater than any gift the college had ever received.

Strider's professional positions included the presidency of the New England Association of Schools and Colleges (1966) and the chairmanship of the Association of American Colleges and Universities (1974). He was also a fellow of the American Academy of Arts and Sciences. In the 1980s, he chaired a governor's commission to study the University of Maine. Strider served as Colby's president for 20 years, at the time the longest presidential tenure in the college's history.

Strider held honorary degrees from 11 colleges, including Colby, which presented honorary doctorates to him and his wife on his retirement in 1979. He was named a life trustee of the college and a scholarship was created in the Strider name. The newly constructed theater in Runnals Union was named in their honor; and in recognition of their love of music, especially choral music, the college established the annual Strider Concert. Also in 1979, the Maine State Bar Association presented him with its Distinguished Citizen Award.

== After Colby ==
After his retirement, the Striders moved to Brookline, Massachusetts, and he served for a time as professor and dean at Wentworth Institute of Technology in Boston.

Following his wife Helen's death, he took residence at the Springhouse retirement community in Jamaica Plain, where he remained active in the pursuit of scholarship, lecturing on Shakespeare and poetry and leading current events discussions until the time of his death.

In 2000, the city of Waterville, Maine named Strider Avenue for him. A lifelong, active Episcopalian, he served vestries at St. James Episcopal Church in New London, CT, St. Marks in Waterville; and Church of Our Saviour in Brookline, MA. His travels, most often with his wife, Helen, covered all 50 states, more than 30 countries and six continents.
