= Nathaniel Butler Jr. =

Nathaniel J. Butler
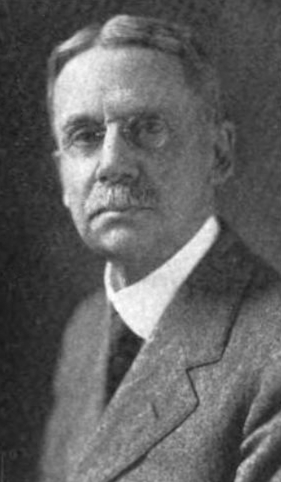

12th President of Colby College
- In office 1896–1901
- Preceded by: Beniah Longley Whitman
- Succeeded by: Charles Lincoln White

Personal details
- Born: May 22, 1853 Eastport, Maine
- Died: March 3, 1927 (aged 73) Chicago, Illinois
- Spouse: Florence Reeves Sheppard (m. 1881; died 1902)
- Children: Sheppard Emery, Albert Nathaniel, Frederic Hamlin
- Education: Colby College

Nathaniel J. Butler (May 22, 1853 – March 3, 1927) was the 12th President of Colby College, Maine, United States from 1896 to 1901.

== Early life ==
Butler was born in Eastport, Maine, to Rev. Nathaniel and Jeanne Emery Butler. He was educated at Camden High School and Coburn Classical Institute, and graduated from Colby College in 1873.

== Career ==
From 1873 to 1876 he was associate principal of the Ferry Hall Female College. From 1876 to 1879 was associate principal of a similar institution at Highland Hall College, Highland Park, Ill. William Rainey Harper called him to the professorship of English Literature at the Old University of Chicago in 1884, where he was also a professor of Latin. From 1889 to 1892 he was a professor of English at The University of Illinois, but after 3 years he returned to the Old University of Chicago as director of university extension. That institution closed in 1896, at which time he was called to Colby College.

== Presidency ==
He was called to the presidency of Colby College in 1896. In 1899, the Maine Legislature obliged his request to change the name of the institution from Colby University to Colby College. He remained at the head of this institution until 1901.

== Post-presidency ==
In 1901 he became professor of education and director of cooperating work in The University of Chicago. He served as Dean of Education at Chicago between the departure of John Dewey in 1904 and the arrival of Charles Hubbard Judd in 1909. He received the degree of D. D. from Colby College in 1895. Dr. Butler was a member of the Phi Beta Kappa society, and of the Delta Kappa Epsilon fraternity. He represented The University of Chicago at the University Extension Congress, held in London, England, in 1894. He was widely known as a writer and lecturer.

Nathaniel Butler died at his home in Chicago on March 3, 1927.

== Published works ==
- Bellum helveticum: For Beginners In Latin. Wheaton College Press, Chicago, IL, 1894. 306 pp.
