= Franklin W. Johnson =

President of Colby College, Maine

Franklin Winslow Johnson

15th President of Colby College
- In office 1929–1942
- Preceded by: Arthur J. Roberts
- Succeeded by: J. Seelye Bixler

Personal details
- Born: August 17, 1870 Jay, Maine
- Died: February 19, 1956 (aged 85) Waterville, Maine
- Education: Colby College

Franklin Winslow Johnson (August 17, 1870 – February 19, 1956) was the 15th President of Colby College, Maine, United States, from 1929–1942. Franklin W. Johnson is widely remembered as the president who began to move Colby College to its Mayflower Hill location and set it on the road to national prestige, in the face of the Great Depression and the beginning of World War II.

== Early life ==
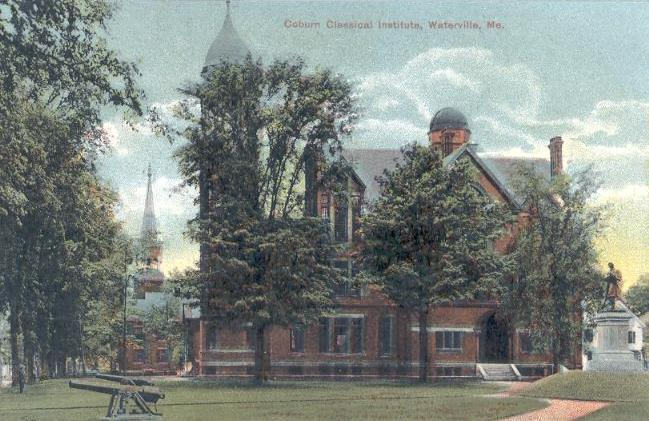
The Coburn Classical Institute in Waterville, Maine

Johnson was born in Jay, Maine in 1870. He was schooled at Wilton Academy, a Bates College Preparatory School of Calvinist Baptist learnings (now called Academy Hill School, for grades 3-6). In the fall of 1887 in a departure from his schooling so far, he chose to enter Colby, a Free Baptist institution at the time, and graduated in 1891.

His first job after graduating was principal of Calais High School, during which time he met and married his wife Carolyn. In 1894 they moved to Waterville and Johnson took a job as the principal of the Coburn Classical Institute. In 1905 he moved to Chicago to become the principal of Morgan Park High School, and in 1907 became principal of the progressive and controversial University of Chicago High School, part of the school system created by John Dewey, and now known as the University of Chicago Laboratory Schools.

During World War I, he was a major in the United States Army Sanitary Corps. After the war, he rejoined John Dewey at Teachers College at Columbia University. In 1920 Colby invited him to join the Board of Trustees, but Johnson continued teaching at Columbia until 1929, when Colby's president Roberts died. Already known and well-respected, Johnson was quickly selected as the new president.

== Presidency at Colby ==
Johnson was inaugurated at the age of 60 in 1929, 2 years after Arthur Roberts had left the college on medical leave under a faculty committee, and weeks after the death of his wife.

Johnson reportedly donated an amount higher than his annual salary to the capital campaign for moving the campus.

He launched the Maine Million, a fundraising campaign to find one million dollars from Maine donors to support the continued construction of the Mayflower Hill campus.

Johnson retired in 1942, when colleges nationwide were suffering from declining male enrollment caused by WWII and educational resources made scarce by the war effort. Lorimer Chapel, Roberts Union, Miller Library, Runnals Hall, and East and West Quad were under construction. In 1948, Johnson Pond was dedicated in his name, and he rowed around the pond to celebrate.

== Published works ==
- The Coburn Classical Institute (article), The centennial history of Waterville, Kennebec County, Maine. June 23, 1902.
