= Rufus Babcock =

American clergyman and college president (1798–1875)

2nd President of Colby College
- In office 1833–1836
- Preceded by: Jeremiah Chaplin
- Succeeded by: Robert Everett Pattison

Personal details
- Born: September 18, 1798 North Colebrook, CT
- Died: May 4, 1875 (aged 76) Salem, ME
- Education: Brown University

Rufus T. Babcock (September 18, 1798 – May 4, 1875) was an American clergyman and the second president of Colby College in Waterville, Maine.

== Life ==
Babcock was born at North Colebrook, Connecticut. His father was Rufus Babcock, who had been a soldier in the revolutionary war, and was pastor of the Baptist church at Colebrook from 1794 to 1842. He graduated Brown University in 1821, and was a tutor for two years at Columbian College in Washington, D. C. In 1823 he was ordained pastor of the Baptist church at Poughkeepsie, N. Y.; in 1826 he became pastor in Salem, Mass.; and in 1833 he was elected as the second president Waterville College (now Colby College) in Waterville, Maine.

At the time, the college was in debt $18,000 and could not meet more than three-fifths of its current expenses. Champlin Hall was erected in 1836. The value of the College property was $50,000.

He resigned in 1836, and accepted the pastorate of the Spruce street Baptist church in Philadelphia, whence he returned after three years to his first charge at Poughkeepsie. He was subsequently pastor of a church in Paterson, N. J., and has held successively the offices of secretary of the American and foreign Bible society, of the American Sunday school union, and of the Pennsylvania colonization society. He edited for five years the "Baptist Memorial." He received a DD from Bowdoin College in 1834. He was the President of the American Baptist Publication Society for many years. He died in Salem, MA.

== Publications ==
- Claims of Education Societies (1829)
- Review of Beckwith on Baptism (1829)
- Making Light of Christ (1830)
- Memoir of Andrew Fuller (1830)
- Sketches of George Leonard, Abraham Booth and Isaac Backus (1832)
- History of Waterville College (1836)
- Tales of Truth for the Young (1837)
- Personal Recollections of J. M. Peck (1858)
- The Emigrant's Mother (1859)
- Memoirs of John M. Peck (1862)
