= Albion Woodbury Small =

American sociologist (1854–1926)

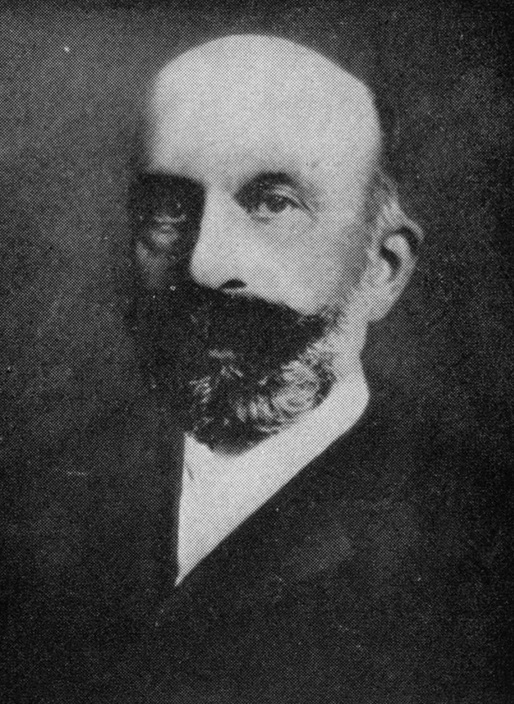

10th President of Colby College
- In office 1889–1892
- Preceded by: George Dana Boardman Pepper
- Succeeded by: Beniah Longley Whitman

Personal details
- Born: May 11, 1854 Buckfield, Maine, US
- Died: February 12, 1926 (aged 71) Chicago, Illinois, US
- Education: Colby College, 1876
- Profession: Sociologist

Albion Woodbury Small (May 11, 1854 – March 24, 1926) founded the first independent department of sociology in the United States at the University of Chicago in Chicago, Illinois, in 1892. He was influential in the establishment of sociology as a valid field of academic study.

== Biography ==
Albion Woodbury Small was born in Buckfield, Maine, to parents Reverend Albion Keith Parris Small and Thankful Lincoln Woodbury. His ancestors settled in Maine in 1632. He lived in Bangor, Maine, and then Portland, Maine, where he attended public schools in both places.

He attended Colby University, now known as Colby College, from 1872 until he graduated in 1876. He studied theology from 1876 to 1879 at the Andover Newton Theological School. From 1879 to 1881 he studied at the University of Leipzig and the University of Berlin in Germany history, social economics and politics. While in Germany, he married Valeria von Massow in June 1881, with whom he had one child.

In the fall of 1881, he became chair of history and political economy at Colby College.

From 1888 to 1889 he studied history at the Johns Hopkins University in Baltimore, Maryland, and was promoted in 1889 with a PhD thesis (The Beginnings of American Nationality) at the same time continuing to teach at Colby College. From 1889 to 1892 he was the 10th president of Colby.

In 1892 he founded the first department of sociology at the University of Chicago. He chaired this department for over 30 years. In 1894 he, along with George E. Vincent, published the first textbook in sociology: An introduction to the study of society. In 1895 he established the American Journal of Sociology. From 1905 to 1925 he served as Dean of the Graduate School of Arts and Literature at the University of Chicago.

Albion Woodbury Small was a member of the Delta Kappa Epsilon fraternity (Xi chapter).

== Influence on sociology ==
Albion Small can be attributed with many "firsts" in the field of sociology. In 1892, he helped to create a department of social science at the University of Chicago, which was the first-ever sociology department in the United States. Then, in 1894, along with colleague George E. Vincent, he wrote the first sociology textbook titled An Introduction to the Study of Society. Lastly, he founded the first Sociology Journal in the United States in 1895, the American Journal of Sociology.

The pioneer sociologist Albion Woodbury Small was one of leading figures amount the social thinkers of the progressive era and during his long career at the university of Chicago did much to shape both sociology and general social through.

== Works ==
- An Introduction to the Study of Society (1894)
- General Sociology (1905)
- Adam Smith and Modern Sociology (1907)
- The Cameralists (1909)
- The Meaning of the Social Sciences (1910)
- Between Eras: From Capitalism to Democracy (1913)
- Origins of Sociology (1921)

== See also ==
- Émile Durkheim
- Florian Znaniecki
- List of liberal thinkers
