= Arthur J. Roberts =

President of Colby College, Maine (1867–1929)

14th President of Colby College
- In office 1908–1927
- Preceded by: Charles Lincoln White
- Succeeded by: Franklin W. Johnson

Personal details
- Born: October 11, 1867 Waterboro, Maine
- Died: 1927
- Spouse: Ada Louise Peabody
- Education: Colby College, Harvard University

Arthur Jeremiah Roberts (October 11, 1867 – 1927) was the 14th President of Colby College, Maine, United States from 1908–1927, notable for being the first non-preacher president of the school. He guided the college through its first centennial celebration and World War I.

== Early life ==
Roberts was born in Waterboro, Maine, to Albert and Evelyn Roberts. He was educated at Alfred High School in Alfred, Maine, and Limerick Academy in Limerick, Maine, before attending Colby College in the fall of 1886 along with a class of 32 other students.

== Career ==
Upon graduating in 1890, Colby College elected him the assistant professor of rhetoric. In 1894, he was promoted to professor of English. In 1895, he married Ms. Ada Louise Peabody. In 1900, he studied one year at Harvard University and received a master's degree.

== Presidency ==
In 1908, he was promoted to president. During his presidency, two new dormitories were constructed, in 1912 and 1915. He led the Centennial Fund, which by 1920 had raised $450,000 in pledges and an additional $125,000 from the General Education Board, for which Roberts had specially applied. His term also saw the creation and dissolution of the Students Army Training Corps at Colby in conjunction with World War I. While at Colby, he was elected as a director of the Maine Central Railroad Company. He was known alternatively as "Old Rob" and "Prexy Roberts".

== Published works ==
- Footprints, Published by Colby College in 1928
