= James Tift Champlin =

American college president (1811–1882)

7th President of Colby College
- In office 1857–1873
- Preceded by: Robert Everett Pattison
- Succeeded by: Henry Ephraim Robins

Personal details
- Born: June 9, 1811 Colchester, Connecticut
- Died: March 15, 1882 (aged 70) Portland, Maine
- Education: Brown University

James Tift Champlin (June 9, 1811 – March 15, 1882) was the seventh President of Colby College, Maine, United States, from 1857-1873.

== Early life ==
James Tift Champlin was born in Colchester, Connecticut on June 9, 1811.

He died in Portland, Maine on March 15, 1882.
