= Colby College =

Private college in Waterville, Maine, US

- Latin: Universitas Colbiana
- Former names: Maine Literary and Theological Institution (1813–1821); Waterville College (1821–1867); Colby University (1867–1899)
- Motto: Lux Mentis Scientia
- Motto in English: Knowledge is the Light of the Mind
- Type: Private liberal arts college
- Established: February 27, 1813; 213 years ago
- Accreditation: NECHE
- Academic affiliations: Oberlin Group
- Endowment: $1.2 billion (2025)
- President: David A. Greene
- Academic staff: 171 full-time and 48 part-time
- Undergraduates: 2,407
- Location: Waterville, Maine, U.S. 44°33′51″N 69°39′47″W
- Campus: 714 acres (289 ha); Rural
- Newspaper: The Colby Echo
- Colors: Blue and gray
- Nickname: Mules
- Sporting affiliations: NCAA Division III – NESCAC; EISA
- Mascot: Morty the Mule
- Website: colby.edu

Colby College is a private liberal arts college in Waterville, Maine, United States. Founded in 1813 as the Maine Literary and Theological Institution, it was renamed Waterville College in 1821. The donations of philanthropist Gardner Colby saw the institution renamed again to Colby University before settling on its current name, reflecting its liberal arts college curriculum, in 1899. Approximately 2,400 students, representing more than 45 states and 80 countries, are enrolled annually. The college offers 58 major fields of study and 38 minors.

Located in central Maine, the 714-acre Neo-Georgian campus sits atop Mayflower Hill and overlooks downtown Waterville and the Kennebec River Valley. Along with fellow Maine institutions Bates College and Bowdoin College, Colby competes in the New England Small College Athletic Conference (NESCAC) and the Colby-Bates-Bowdoin Consortium.

== History ==
=== 19th century ===
On February 27, 1813, the Commonwealth of Massachusetts, led by Baptists, adopted a petition to establish the Maine Literary and Theological Institution. It was moved to Waterville, Maine, and used 179 acres of land donated by citizens. In 1818, trustees assigned the institution to Jeremiah Chaplin and classes began in a vacant Waterville home. After Maine separated from Massachusetts in 1820, the first Maine legislature affirmed the Massachusetts charter for the institution, but made significant changes. Students could no longer be denied admission based on religion, the institution was prohibited from applying a religious test when selecting board members, and the trustees now had the authority to grant degrees. The Maine Literary and Theological Institution was renamed Waterville College on February 5, 1821, and four years later, the theological department was discontinued. In 1828 the trustees decided to turn the somewhat informal preparatory department of the college into a separate school named Waterville Academy (most recently called the Coburn Classical Institute).

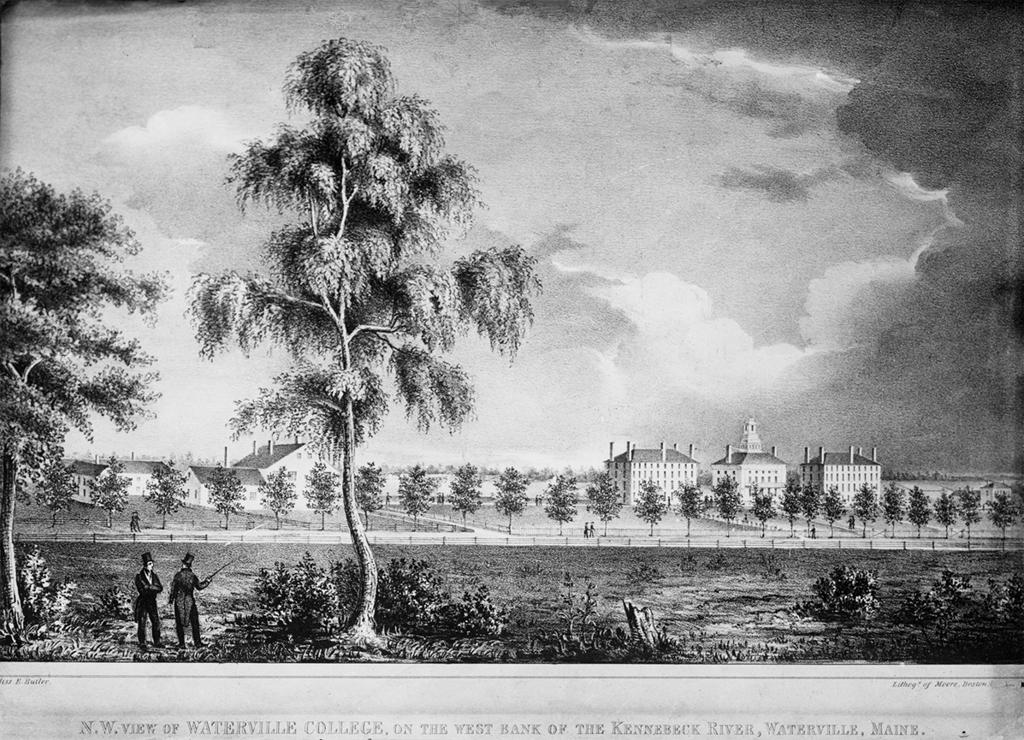
A lithograph depicting the Waterville College campus in 1834

In 1833, Rufus Babcock became Colby's second president. That same year, students formed the nation's first college-based anti-slavery society. In 1845, the college's first Greek Society was formed, a chapter of Delta Kappa Epsilon, which was followed by chapters of Zeta Psi in 1850 and Delta Upsilon in 1852.

During the Civil War, many young men were called away from school to join the fight; from Waterville College, Richard C. Shannon, Henry C. Merriam, and Benjamin Butler. Twenty-seven Waterville College students perished in the war, and more than 100 men from the town. In the years following the war, as was the case at many American colleges, Waterville College was left with few students remaining to pay the bills and a depleted endowment. The college was on the verge of closing.

On August 9, 1865, prominent Baptist philanthropist Gardner Colby attended Waterville College's commencement dinner, and unbeknownst to anyone in attendance except college president James Tift Champlin, announced a matching $50,000 donation to the college; two years later the college was named after him. Trustees of the college voted to construct a library and chapel to honor the Colby men who died in the war, called the Memorial Hall; it was dedicated at the commencement of 1869. At the 1871 commencement, a Martin Milmore sculpture based on the Lion of Lucerne was added as the centerpiece of the building.

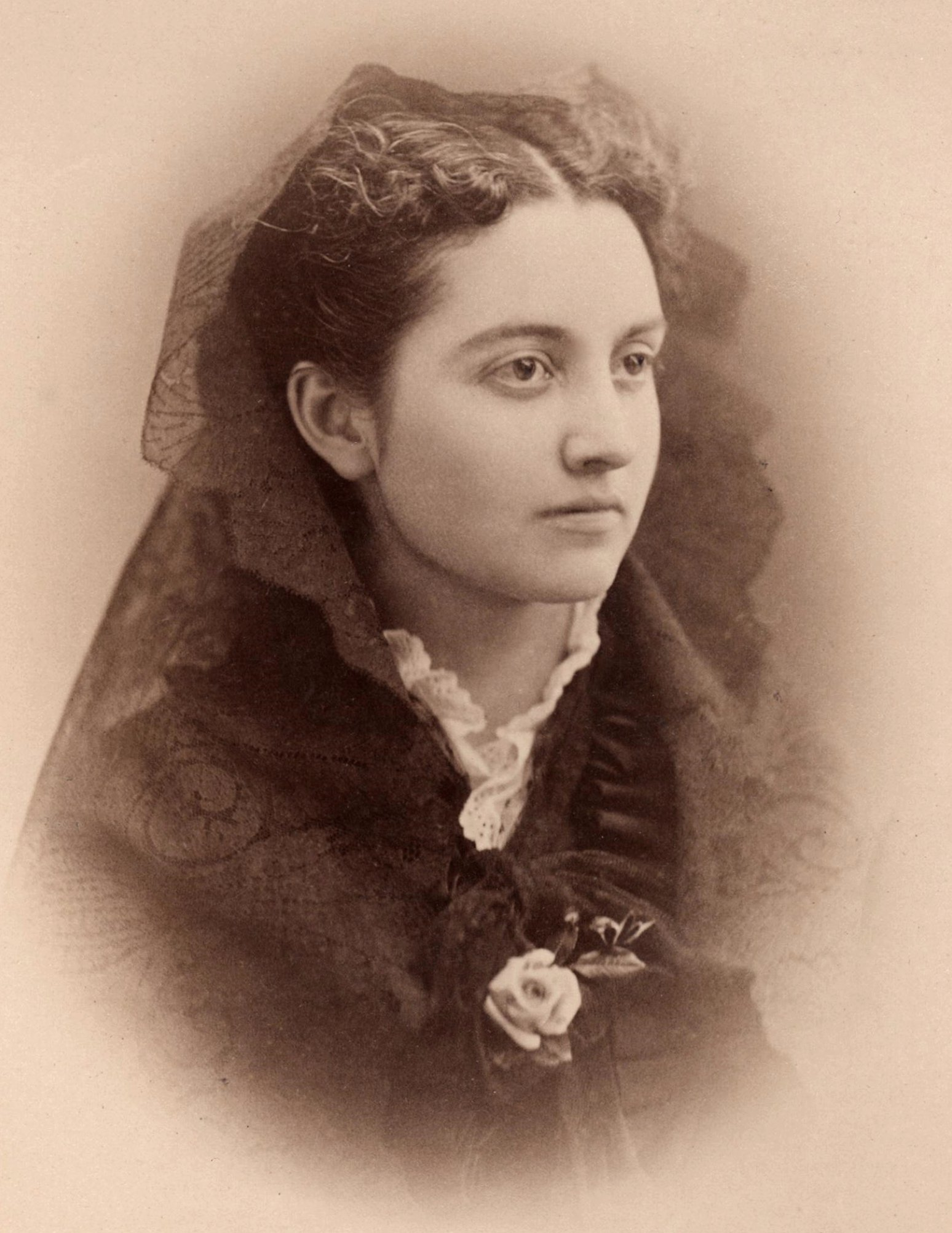
Mary Caffrey Low, the first female graduate of the college and valedictorian of the class of 1875

In the fall of 1871, Colby University was the first all-male college in New England to accept female students. The national Sigma Kappa sorority was founded at Colby in 1874 by the college's first five female students. However the college temporarily resegregated them in 1890. One of the buildings is named after the first woman to attend, Mary Caffrey Low, who was the valedictorian of the Class of 1875. In "The History of Colby College," Ernest C. Marriner wrote, "No small part of the agitation that arose later in regard to the retention of women in the College was prompted by the fact that they persistently ran away with the honors." In 1890, the president of Colby initiated a plan to divide women and men into separate classes at the college. Low, along with Louise Coburn and 17 other women who had graduated from Colby, sent a petition protesting the move. The letter declared, "The issue is not whether men and women can recite together, whether men and women shall study this or that. It is simply the issue whether the men are willing to take the risk of having women surpass them in scholarship."

In 1874, based on the success of its partnership with the Coburn Classical Institute, Colby created relationships with Hebron Academy and Houlton Academy (most recently known as Ricker College). In 1893, the Higgins Classical Institute was also deeded to Colby – the last preparatory school that the university would acquire. Students published the first issue of the Colby Echo in 1877. On January 25, 1899, Colby president Nathaniel Butler Jr., Class of 1873, renamed the "university" Colby College.

=== 20th century ===
In 1920, Colby celebrated its centennial, marking not the date of the original charter (1813), but the date of its charter from the new State of Maine in 1820.

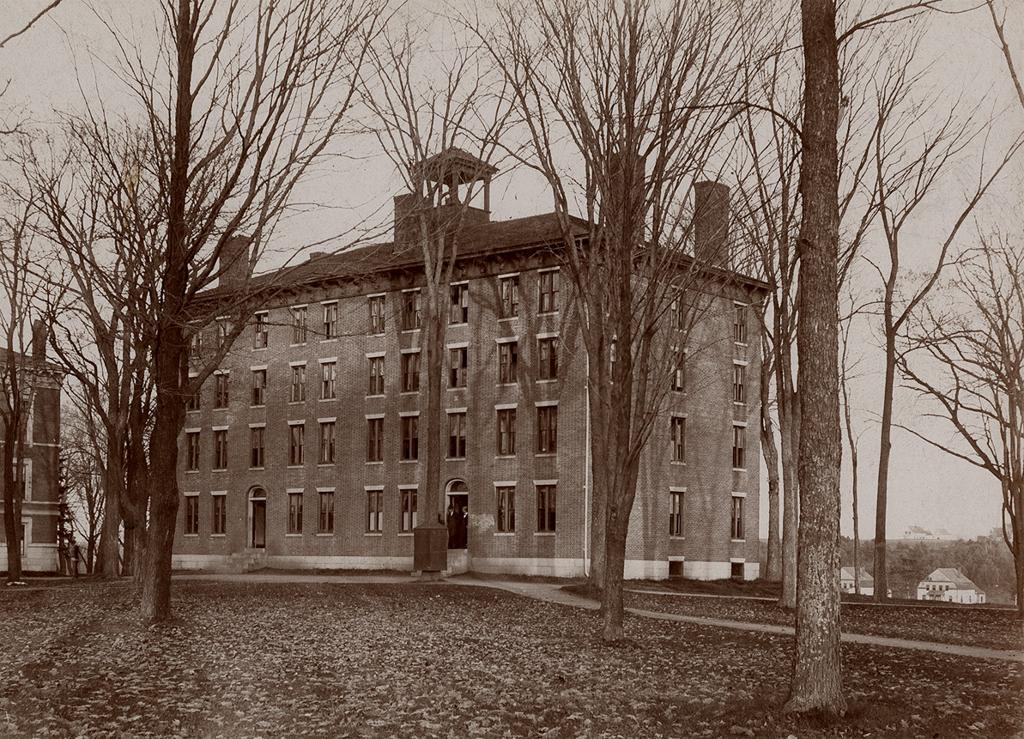
South College of the original Waterville College campus

In June 1929, Franklin W. Johnson was appointed president of the college. That same year saw the public release of the Maine Higher Education Survey Report, which gave Colby's campus a less than desirable review. Criticisms included a cramped location on just 28 acres located between the Kennebec River and the Maine Central Railroad Company tracks through Waterville, an aging physical plant, proximity to the unpleasant odors of a pulp mill, and the soot of the railroad. Using the report as justification, President Johnson presented a proposal to the Trustees on June 14, 1929, to move the college to a more adequate location. The campaign to raise funds for the move was immediately complicated by the Wall Street crash of 1929 and the Great Depression, and competing offers for the college's contemplated location emerged. Most notably, William H. Gannett offered a site in Augusta, a financially attractive option for the college, but a troublesome prospect for the town of Waterville. Ultimately, a joint effort between Waterville citizens and the college raised more than $100,000 to purchase 600 acres (2.4 km^{2}) near the outskirts of the city on Mayflower Hill, and the deed was presented to the college on April 12, 1931.

==== Mayflower Hill ====
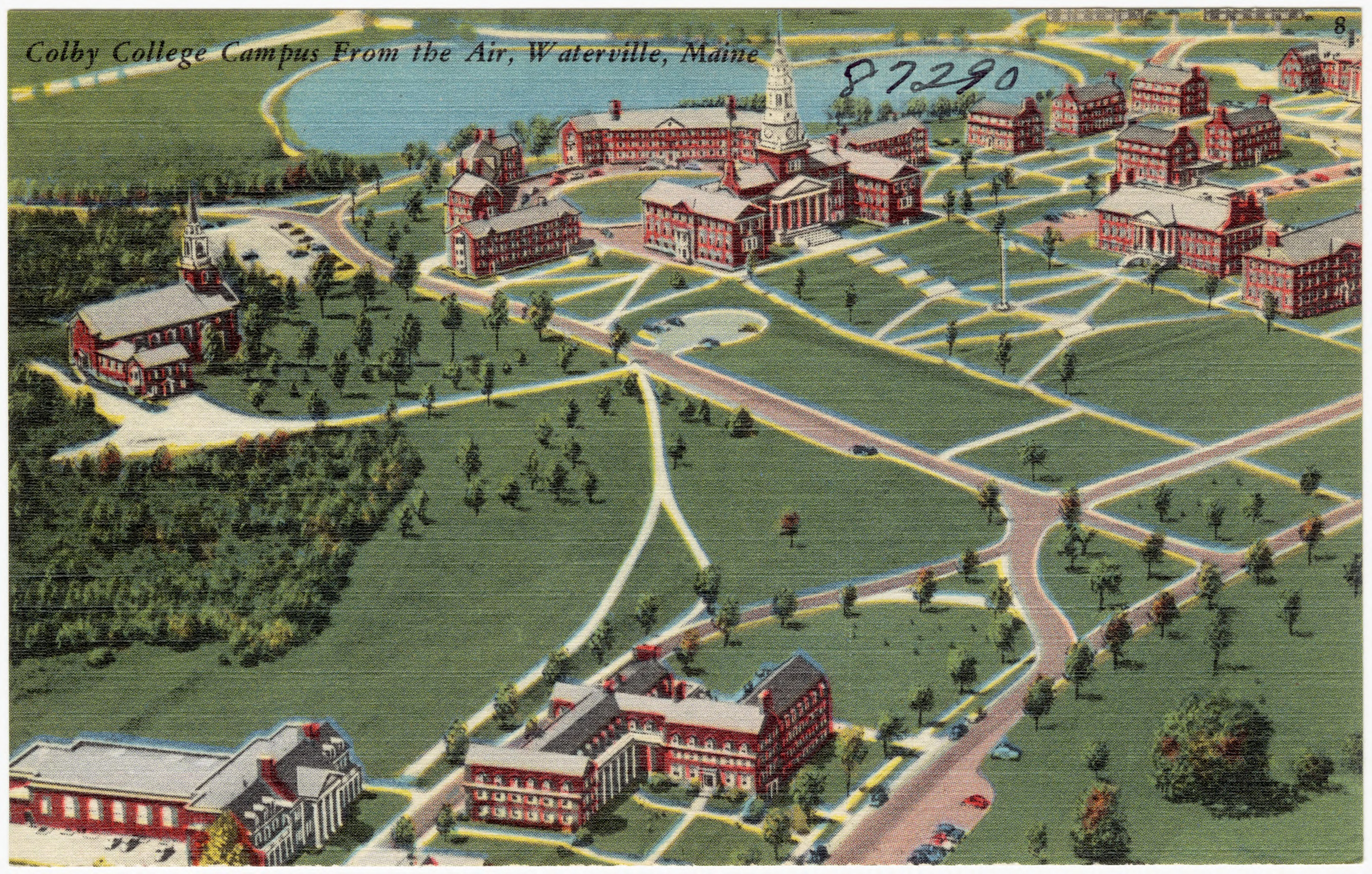
An illustration of the Mayflower Hill campus, circa 1945.

In 1937, construction broke ground on Lorimer Chapel according to master plans drawn up by Jens Fredrick Larson. It was to be the first building on the Mayflower Hill campus. In 1956, the Maine State Highway Commission diverted the proposed path of Interstate 95 to swing clear of the new campus to the west. The college began competing athletically with Bowdoin and Bates in the 1940s, and officially joined the two colleges in the Colby-Bates-Bowdoin Consortium in 1965. The consortium became both an athletic rivalry and an academic exchange program.

=== 21st century ===
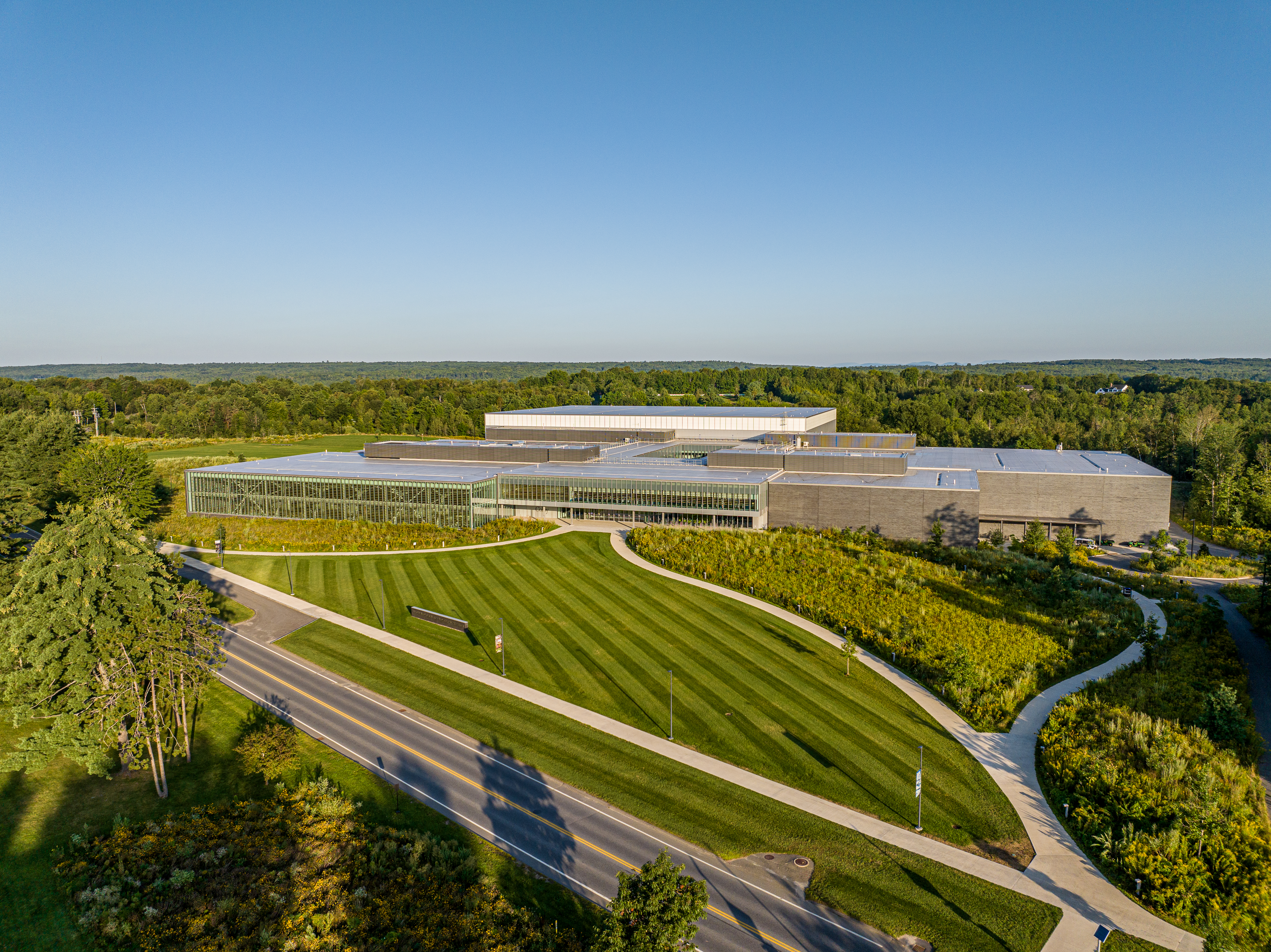
The Harold Alfond Athletics and Recreation Center, which opened in 2020.

William D. Adams was the president of Colby from 2000 to 2014. Major accomplishments included conducting the largest capital campaign in the history of Maine, which raised $376 million; a new strategic plan for the college; accepting a major gift for the Colby College Museum of Art – the Lunder Collection of American Art – and the construction of a new wing for the museum to house it in 2013; expansion onto the "Colby Green" with the construction of the Diamond Building in 2007 and the Davis Science Building in 2014. In 2014, a documentary was created depicting a wide range of student experiences, including academic climate, social gatherings, athletics, and graduate outlooks, called Colby Life.

On July 1, 2014, David A. Greene took office as the new president of the college. Under Greene's leadership, Colby launched Dare Northward, the most successful fundraising initiative by a liberal arts college at more than $1 billion, exceeding its original goal of $750 million.

With a priority on community engagement and partnerships, Colby has led an investment of more than $250 million in downtown Waterville since 2019.

In 2022, Colby acquired two historic islands in Muscongus Bay.

== Academics ==
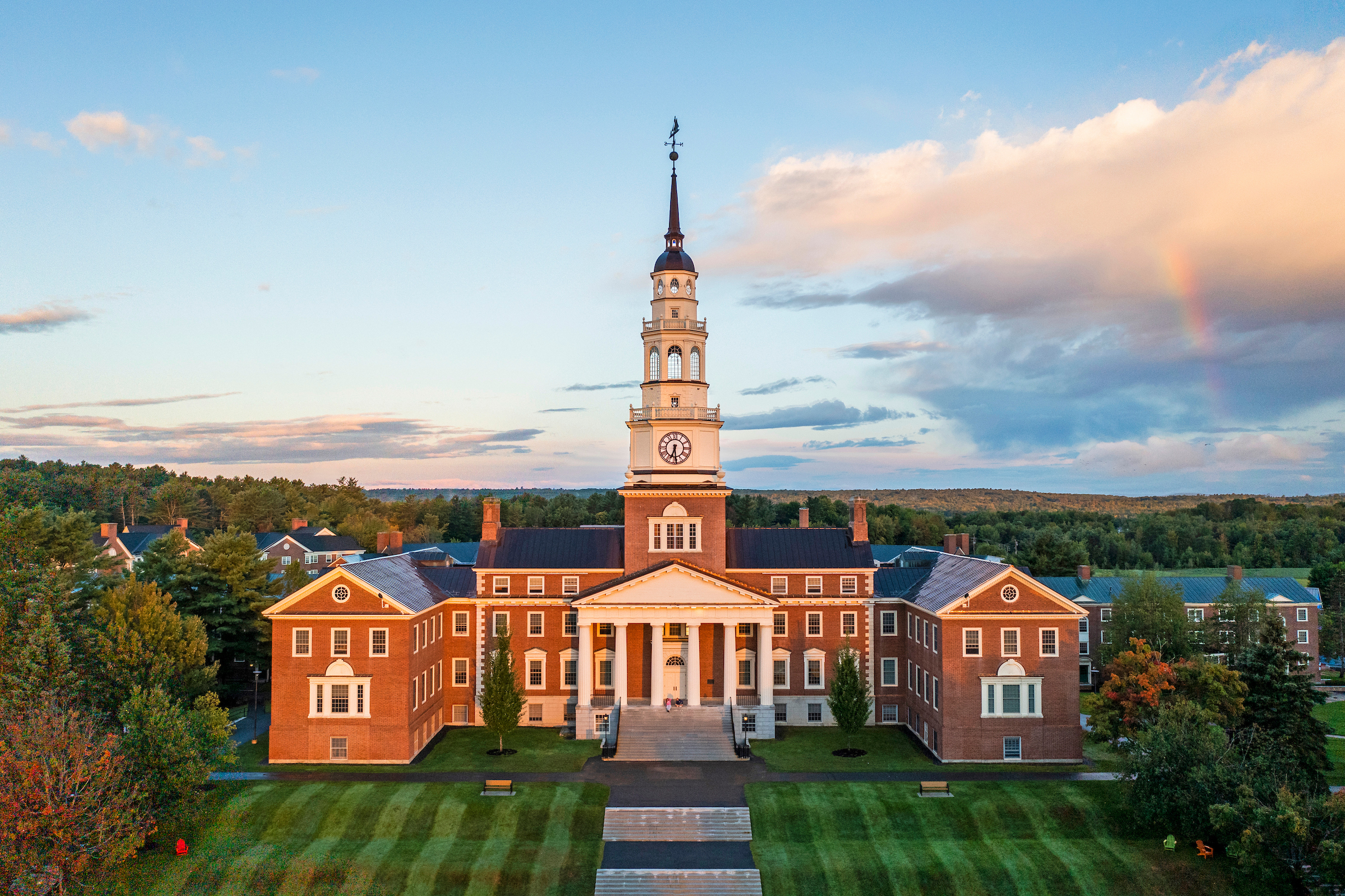
Colby College

Students choose from courses in 48 major fields and have flexibility in designing independent study programs, electing special majors, and participating in internships and study-abroad programs. Colby emphasizes project-based learning. Colby's three most popular majors, by 2021 graduates, were econometrics and quantitative economics (62); political science and government (62); and computer science (34).

More than two-thirds of Colby's students spend time studying off-campus before they graduate, at over 200 off-campus programs in more than 60 countries.

| | 2016 | 2017 | 2018 | 2019 | 2020 | 2021 | 2022 | 2023 | 2024 |
| Applicants | 9,833 | 11,190 | 12,313 | 13,584 | 13,922 | 15,857 | 16,891 | 17,800 | 19,188 |
| Admits | 1,838 | 1,768 | 1,602 | 1,295 | 1,307 | 1,279 | 1,258 | 1,142 | 1,275 |
| Admit rate | 18.7% | 15.8% | 13% | 9.5% | 9.4% | 8.1% | 7.4% | 6.4% | 6.6% |
| Median SAT | 1370 | 1420 | 1490 | 1500 | N/A | 1520 | 1500 | 1510 | 1510 |
| Median ACT | 31 | 32 | 33 | 34 | N/A | 34 | 34 | 34 | 34 |

For the Class of 2027, Colby College admitted 6% of applicants, accepting 1,142 out of nearly 17,800 applicants.

== Campus ==
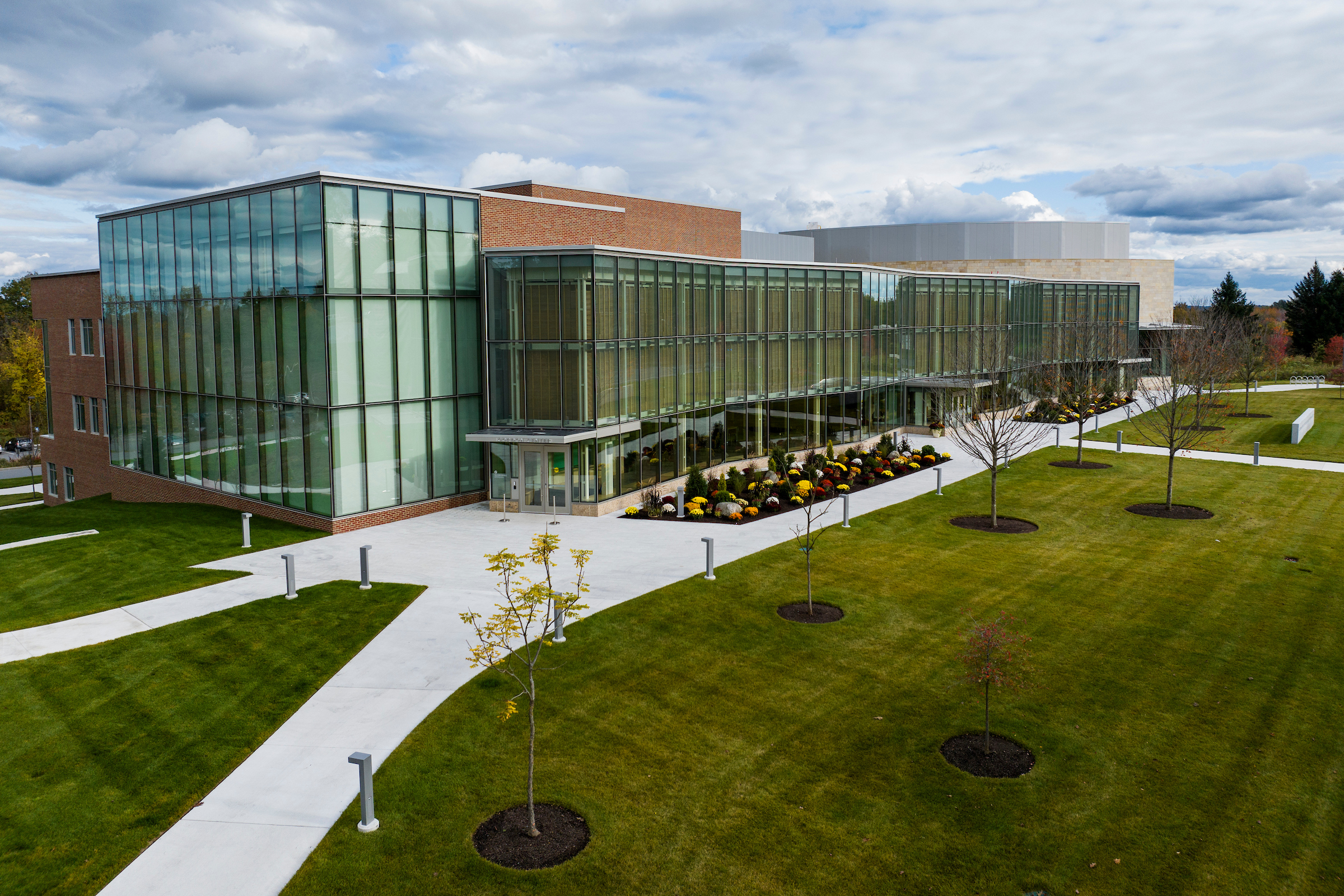
Gordon Center for Creative and Performing Arts, which opened in 2023.

Colby's 714-acre campus is situated on Mayflower Hill in Waterville, located along the Kennebec River Valley in Central Maine. Most of Colby's buildings are designed in the Georgian Revival style. The college earned a top-25 listing on the Peace Corps' "ranking of colleges that produce the most volunteers."

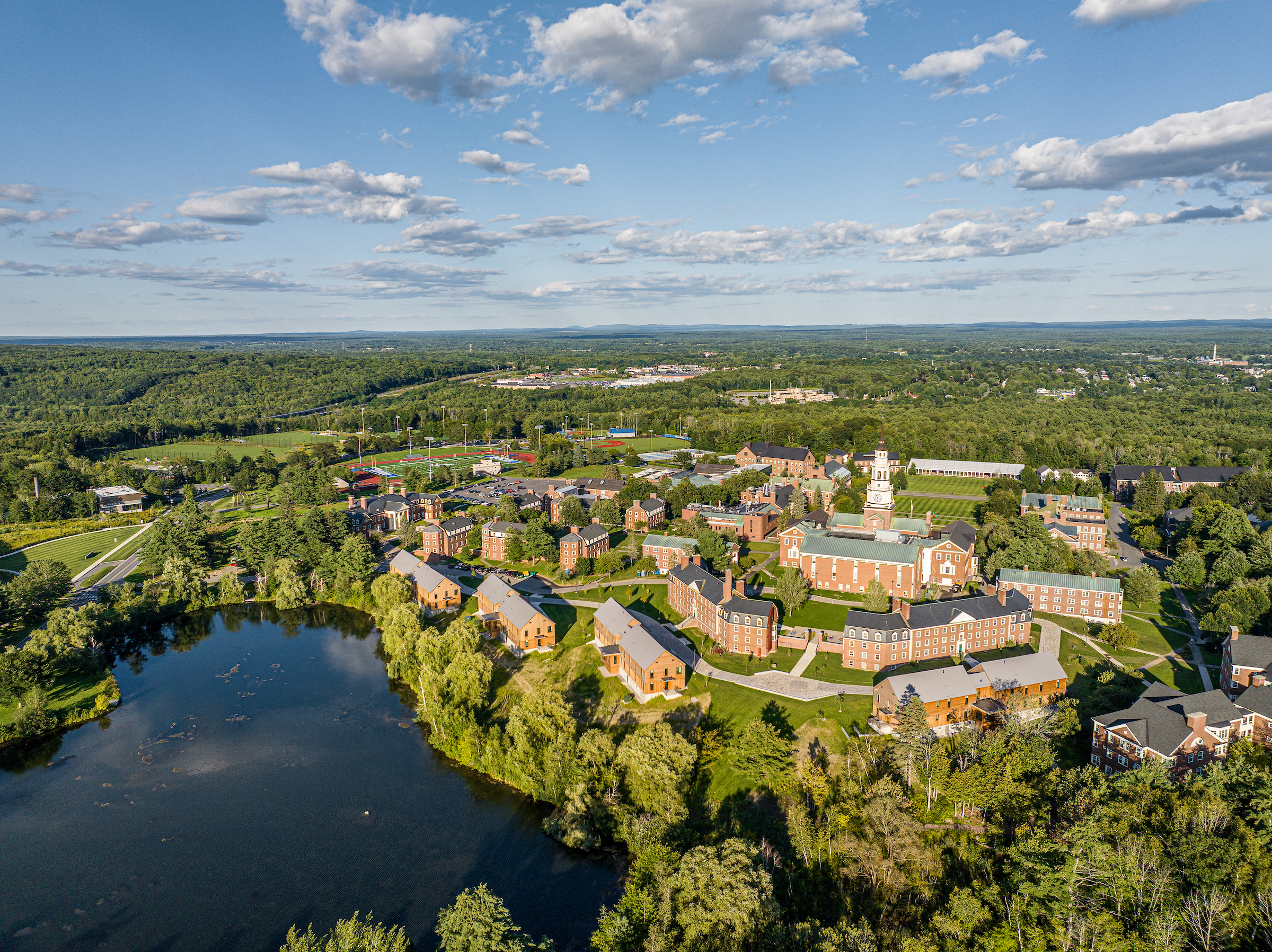
Colby College campus, 2022

Colby is a residential college. Almost all students live in residential halls on campus or downtown.

In February 2022, the college announced the acquisition of Allen and Benner islands, adjacent private islands four miles southwest of Port Clyde in the Gulf of Maine, from the Up East Foundation and the Wyeth Foundation for American Art.

=== Libraries ===
Colby's two libraries—Miller Library, the Bixler Art and Music Library, have a collection of more than 1.7 million items, including more than 530,000 electronic books, and access to more than 22,000 print and 130,000 electronic periodicals and newspapers. In 2022 the Olin Science Library was repurposed into offices for the Davis Institute of Artificial Intelligence and the Halloran Lab for Entrepreneurship as well study spaces.

=== Colby College Museum of Art ===
The Colby College Museum of Art is based both on the campus and in downtown Waterville, and provides free entry while serving Colby College academic programs. It holds a permanent collection of artworks, temporary exhibits, publishes academic journals and runs community programs dedicated mainly to American art.

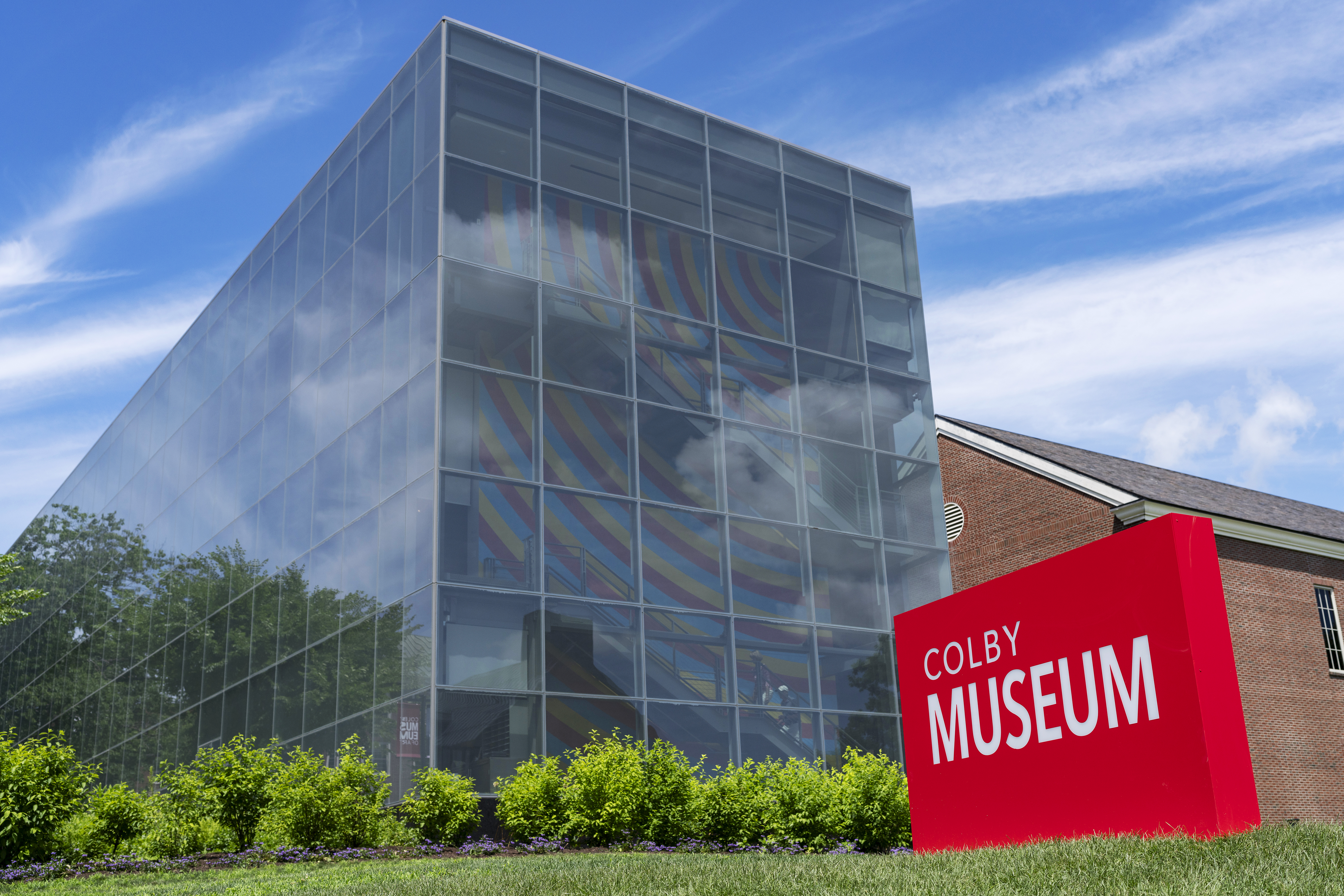
Colby College Museum of Art, 2024

The most recent addition to the museum was the Alfond-Lunder Family Pavilion, opened in 2013 to display the Lunder Collection of American Art. The gallery space in the museum now exceeds 40,000 square feet, surpassing the Portland Museum of Art and making it the largest art museum in Maine.

=== Sustainability ===
Colby College is a recognized leader in campus sustainability, having become one of the first carbon-neutral colleges in the United States in 2013. The college mandates rigorous green building standards, currently requiring a minimum LEED Gold rating for all new construction and major renovations; as a result, 45% of the campus — totaling 20 certified spaces — is LEED-certified. Sustainability efforts extend to landscaping through SITES certification and native plant requirements, as well as dining services that prioritize local sourcing and compost over 200 tons of food waste each year. Additionally, Colby promotes reduced resource consumption through single-stream recycling, green purchasing and cleaning policies, and a variety of sustainable transportation options, including electric vehicle charging stations and the iBike loan program. The dining halls make an effort to purchase local and organic foods, and the elimination of trays has saved 79,000 gallons of water and 50 tons of food waste annually. Colby also has a composting program which processes more than 100 tons of food and yard waste annually.

== Student life ==
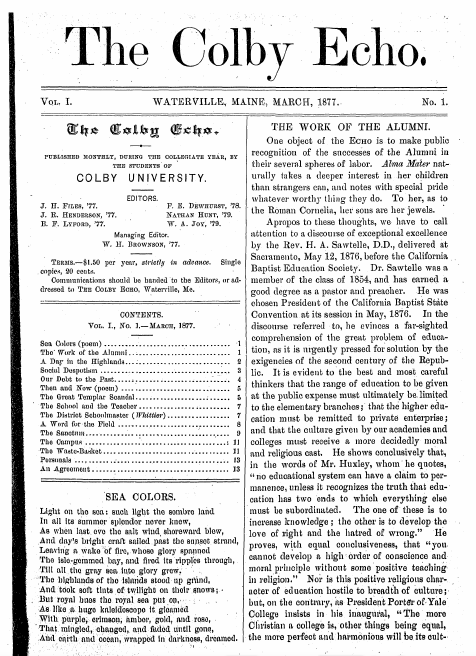
The inaugural issue of the Colby Echo student newspaper, 1877.

Colby's 2,400 students, closely divided between men and women, come from more than 45 states and represent 60 countries.

Colby's was one of the five original schools to partner with the Shelby Davis Scholarship program for graduates from the United World Colleges, dramatically increasing the international student population. Colby also participates in the Posse Foundation Match Program, and QuestBridge National College Match.

The college hosts myriad student-run organizations. The Student Government Association (SGA) advises and interacts with the college administration on issues ranging from policies and procedures to class presidents and dorm heads; it is also responsible for allocating funding to other student-run organizations.

=== Athletics ===
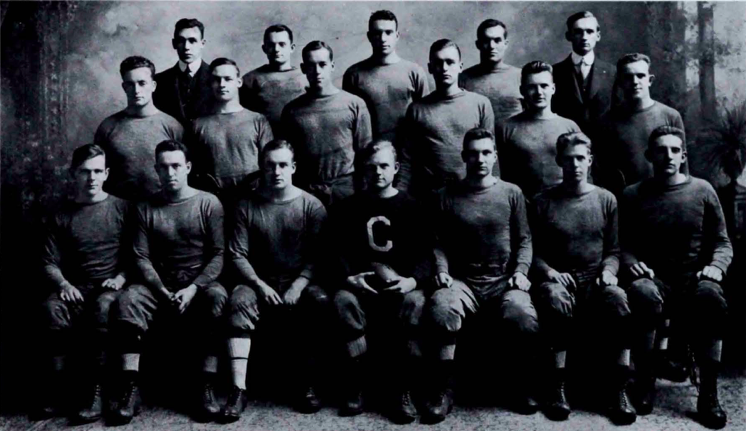
The 1914 Colby Mules football team has been described as the greatest in Colby's history and one of the strongest college teams ever in the state of Maine

The Colby Mules compete in National Collegiate Athletic Association (NCAA) Division III, and the New England Small College Athletic Conference (NESCAC), as well as the Eastern Intercollegiate Ski Association (EISA) for skiing. Beginning Intercollegiate competition in 1876 (Baseball), Colby Athletics has grown to include 16 varsity teams for women and 16 for men, for a total of 32 varsity programs. The most recent programs added were Men's and Women's Alpine and Nordic Skiing in 1979, Volleyball in 1991, and Men's and Women's Crew in 1993. Approximately one-third of the student population participates in one or more varsity sport. Colby also offers club sports and intramural programming. As of 2025, five graduates had qualified for the Olympic Games, and Colby athletes have captured 12 team or individual National Championships.

The Harold Alfond Athletics and Recreation Center is the center of athletic life at Colby and home to the Colby Mules. The 350,000-square-foot facility is the most comprehensive Division III facility in the country.

=== Fraternities ===
In 1984, following an investigation of campus life commissioned by the Board of Trustees, a decision was made to withdraw recognition from Colby's Greek system as it was seen to be "exclusionary by nature."

== Notable alumni ==
Notable Colby alumni include:

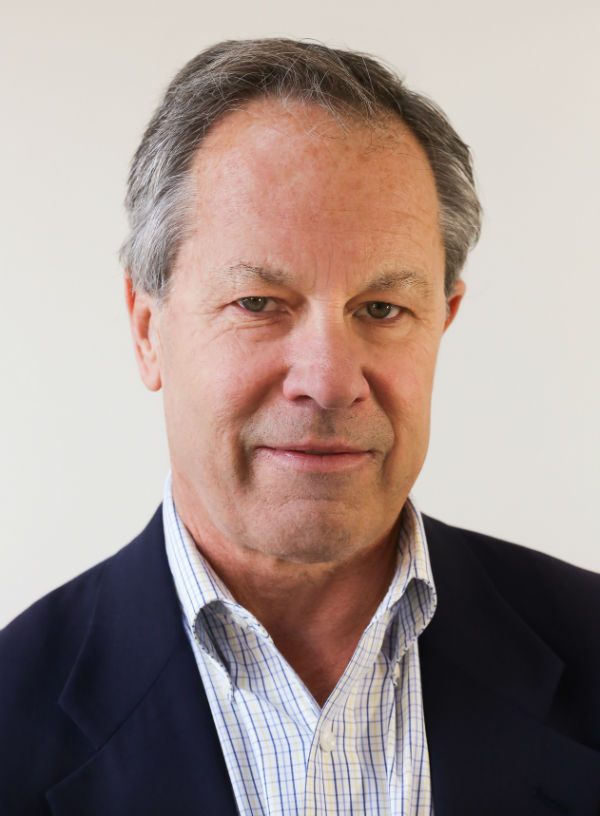
Ben Bradlee Jr.
(B.A. '70)
Journalist

Benjamin Butler
(B.A. 1839)
Major General in the Union Army

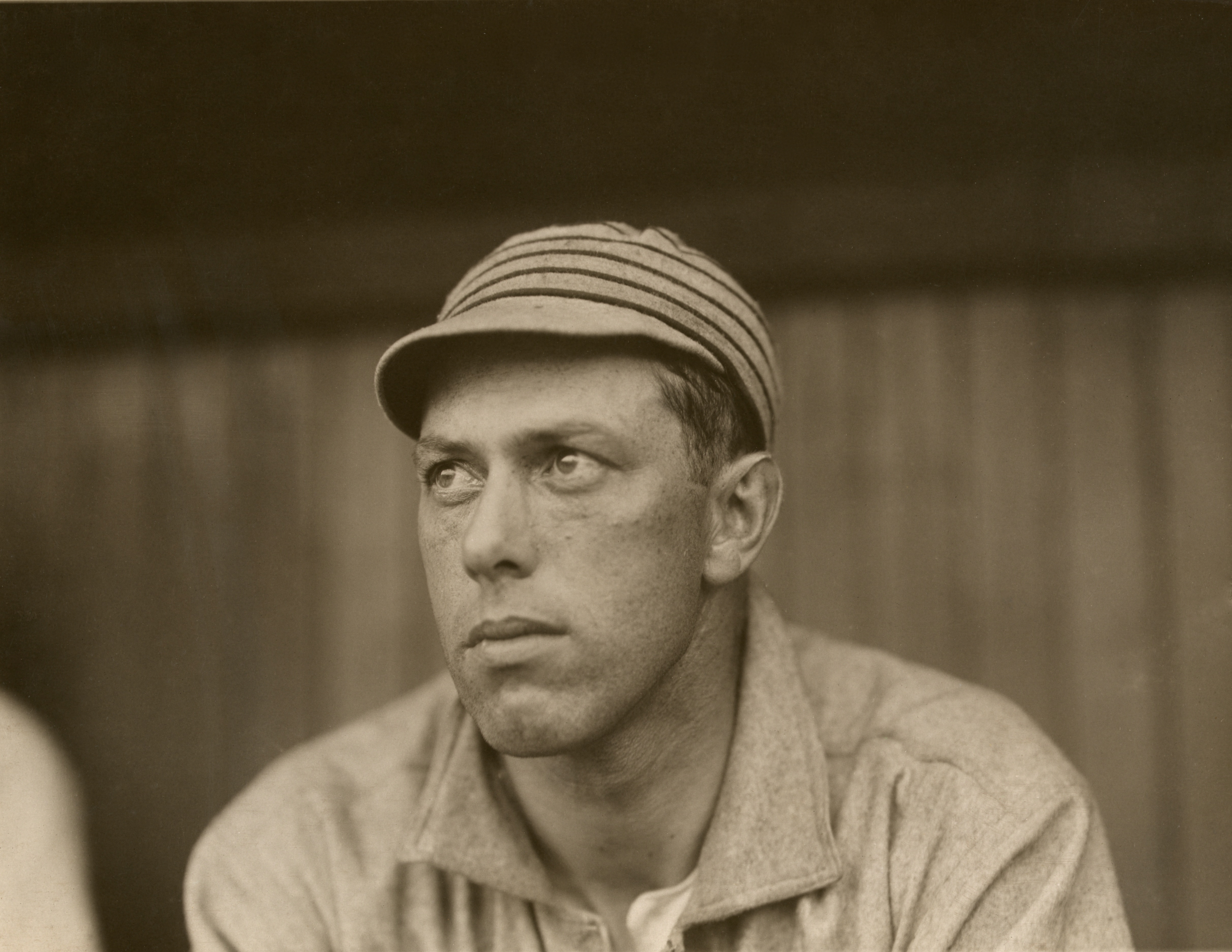
Jack Coombs
(B.A. 1906)
Baseball player

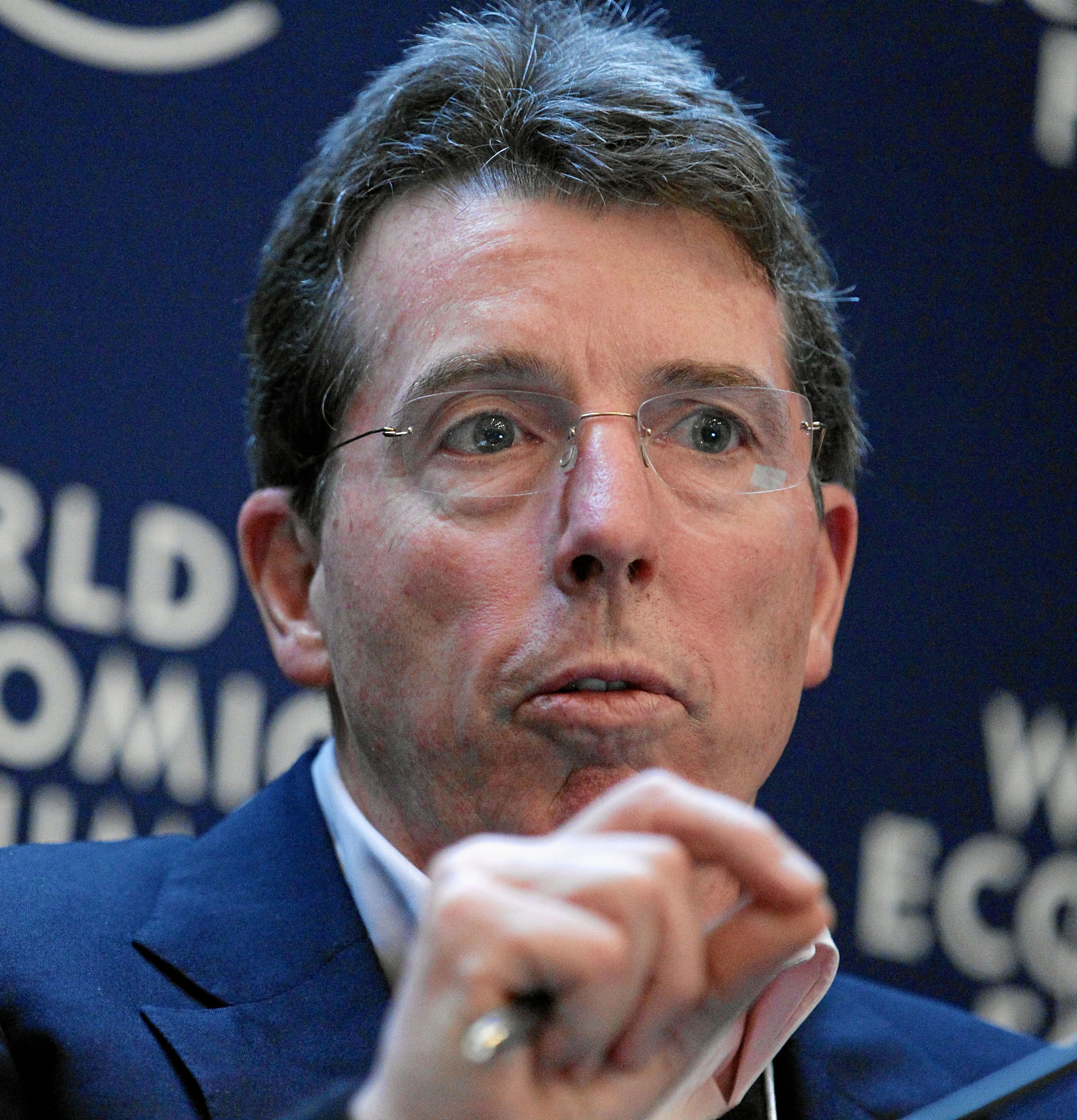
Bob Diamond
(B.A. '73)
Former CEO of Barclays

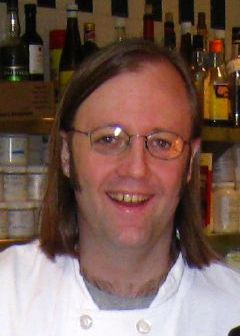
Wylie Dufresne
(B.A. '92)
Chef

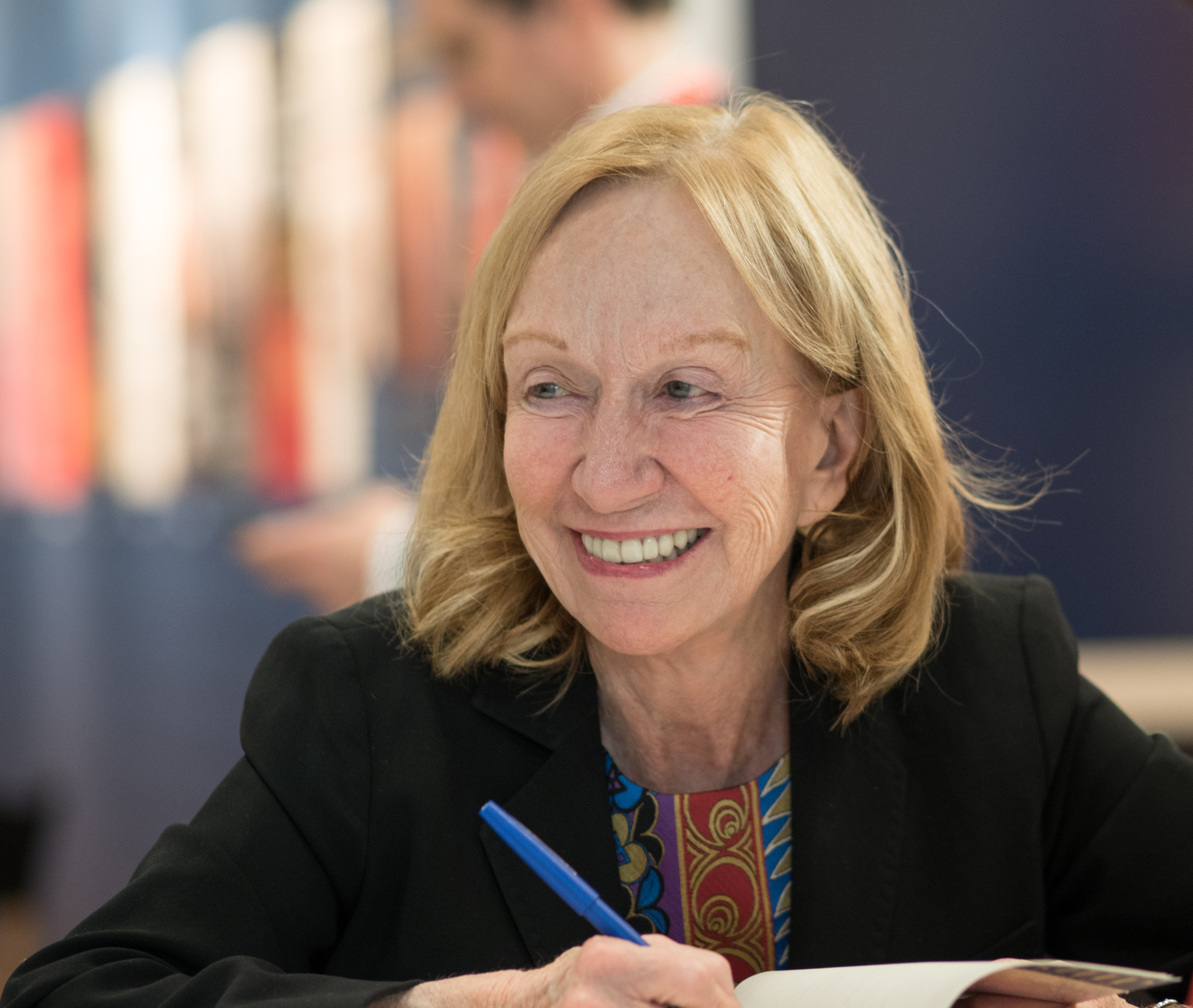
Doris Kearns Goodwin
(B.A. '64)
Historian

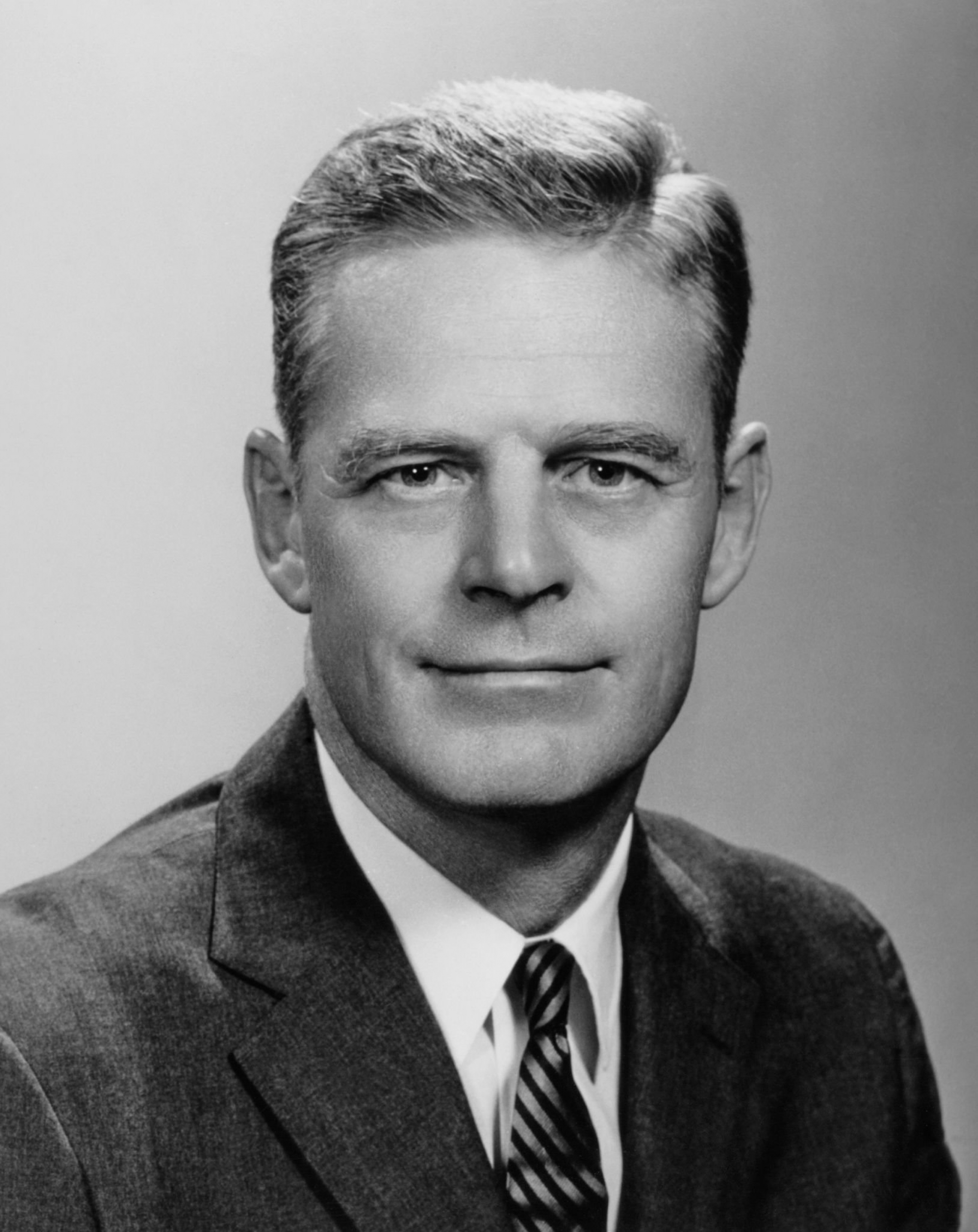
Edward Gurney
(B.A. '35)
U.S. Senator from Florida

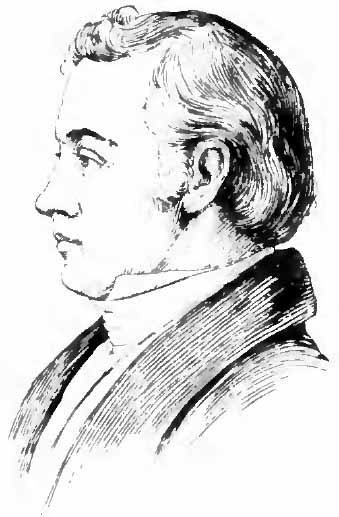
Elijah Parish Lovejoy
(B.A. 1826)
Journalist and abolitionist

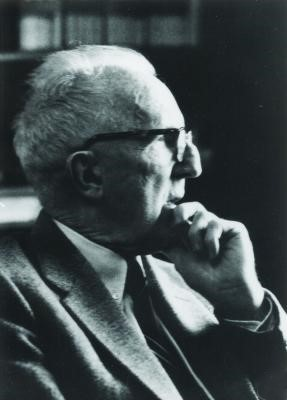
Marston Morse
(B.A. 1914)
Mathematician

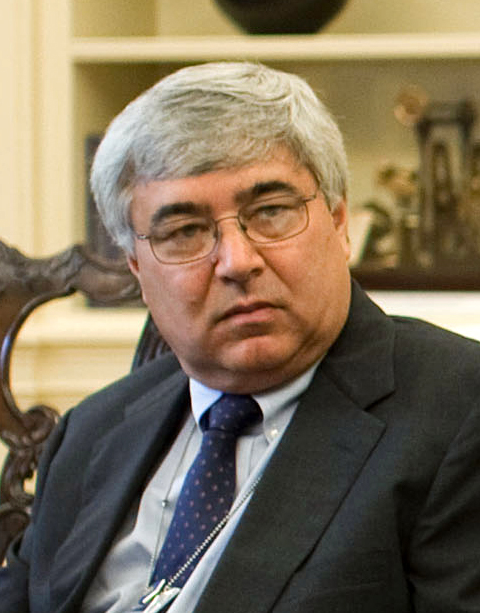
Pete Rouse
(B.A. '68)
Former Acting White House Chief of Staff

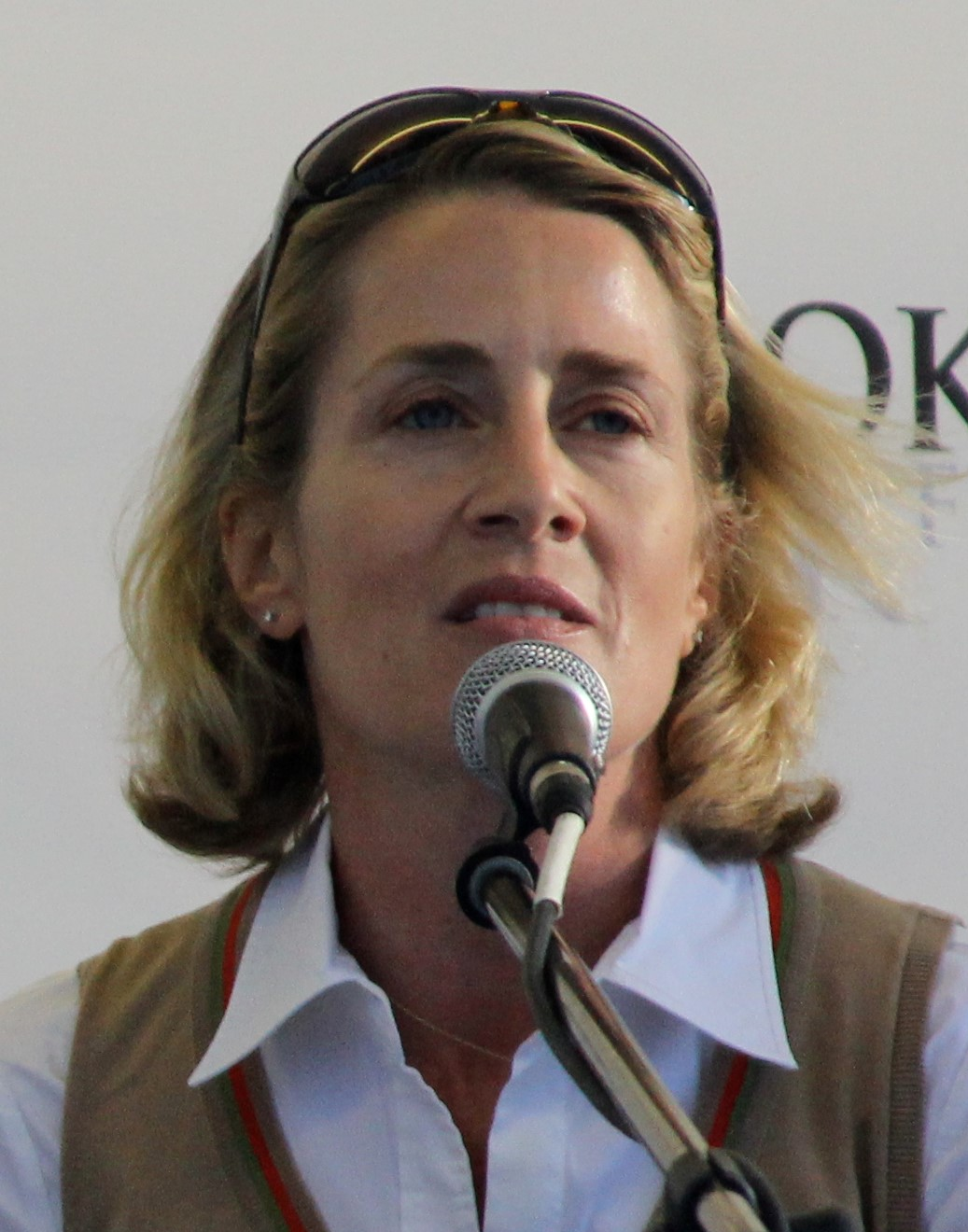
Cecily von Ziegesar
(B.A. '92)
Creator of the Gossip Girl series

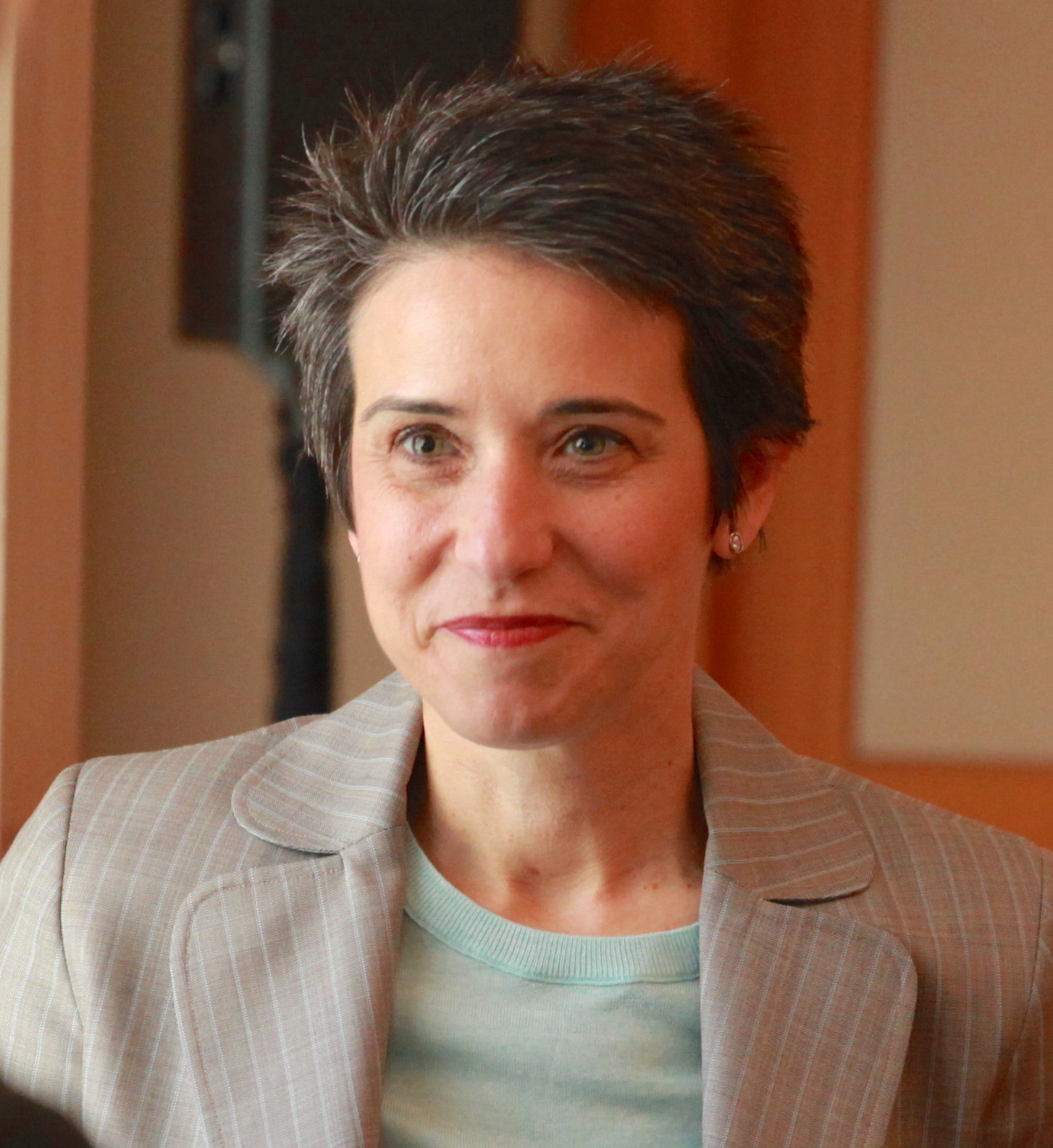
Amy Walter
(B.A. '91)
Political analyst

Alumni, now numbering more than 25,000, are represented in all 50 states and 75 countries.

Colby alumni include governors Lot M. Morrill (ex-1869), Harris M. Plaisted (1881–1883), Nelson Dingley, Jr. (1874–1876), Llewellyn Powers (1901–1908), Benjamin Butler (1883–1884), Marcellus Stearns (1874–1877), and George A. Ramsdell (1897–1899).

Other notable alumni include: Harvard professor, president emeritus of the World Association for Disaster and Emergency Medicine, and White House consultant Gregory Ciottone (1987); former Barclaysqq1 Chief Executive Officer Robert Diamond (1973); U.S. senator from Florida (1969–1974) Edward Gurney (1935), abolitionist Elijah P. Lovejoy (1826); former Assistant Secretary for Public Affairs and U.S. State Department spokesman Sean McCormack (1986); mathematician and founding member of the Institute for Advanced Study Marston Morse (1914); former president and CEO of the Federal Reserve Bank of Boston Eric S. Rosengren (1979); former White House Chief of Staff Pete Rouse (1968); author Doris Kearns Goodwin (1964); pathologist and author Stephen Sternberg (1941); and academic and author of the Spenser detective novels, the late Robert B. Parker (1954); the late Pulitzer-Prize winning author Gregory White Smith (1973); political analyst and publisher and editor in chief of the Cook Political Report with Amy Walter (1991); former Political Director of ABC News and, former editor in chief of The Hotline, and NFLqq1 Executive Vice President and General Manager of the Baltimore Ravens Eric DeCosta (1993).

=== Colby presidents ===
The administration is made up of the president, officers, a Board of Trustees with faculty and student representation, and a Board of Visitors. Since the founding of the college in 1813, 20 presidents have served, with Colby alumni having served as four presidents of the college: Albion Woodbury Small, Class of 1876, president from 1889 to 1892; Nathaniel Butler Jr., Class of 1873, president from 1896 to 1901; Arthur J. Roberts, Class of 1890, president from 1908 to 1927; and Franklin W. Johnson, Class of 1891, president from 1929 to 1942. David A. Greene has served in the role since 2014.

== Insignia and other representations ==
=== Seal and motto ===
"Lux Mentis Scientia," meaning "knowledge is the light of the mind," is the college's motto. The college was originally authorized to have a seal by its founding charter, granted by the Massachusetts General Court in 1813. Presently, the seal figures prominently on college diplomas as well as other official communications.

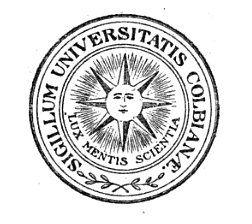
The emblem of Colby University, c. 1895.

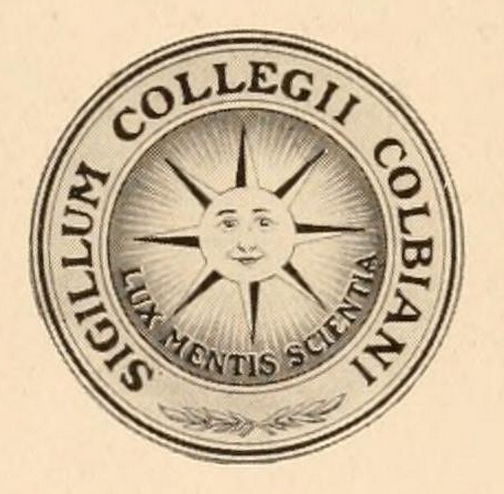
The Colby College Seal, reflecting the college's new name, c. 1899.

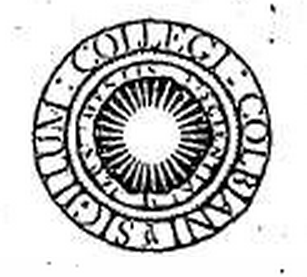
The Colby College Seal, redesigned by William Addison Dwiggins, c. 1936.

current Colby College seal, 2026.

==== History and revisions ====
The history of the seal tracks both the history of the school, which began under the name Maine Literary and Theological Institution, and sigillography generally. The earliest known seal came while the school was called Colby University. It featured a sun in splendour with eight straight rays above the school's Latin motto. Surrounding the center are the words "Sigillum Universitatis Colbianae," meaning "the seal of Colby College," and two crossed olive branch with five leaves each. In 1899 the "university" was renamed Colby College, and a new seal was created with minor artistic changes to reflect the school's new name.

In 1936, President Franklin W. Johnson commissioned William Addison Dwiggins to design a seal to replace the one then existing, specifying only that it use the same motto as the first and retain the sun as the central theme. The cost of the design was $50. The face on the sun was removed and the lettering and its positioning were changed.

In 2002, the college contracted with design firm Corey McPherson Nash for updates to its entire visual identity system, including the seal. The current seal is set in Perpetua typeface around a sunburst. The seal is registered with the United States Patent and Trademark Office as a trademark under registration number 2773337. A special seal was developed for the college's bicentennial celebration in 2013.

=== Alma mater ===
Colby's alma mater is "Hail, Colby, Hail." The lyrics to the song were written by Karl R. Kennison of the Class of 1906. It is sung to the tune of "O Canada." In 1979, the second line was changed from "thy sons from far and near" to "thy people far and near."
