= Philip Merrill =

American diplomat, publisher, banker and philanthropist

- Born: Philip Merrill Levine; April 28, 1934; Baltimore, Maryland, U.S.
- Died: June 10, 2006 (aged 72); Chesapeake Bay, U.S.
- Occupations: Diplomat, publisher
- Known for: Philanthropy

Philip Merrill (April 28, 1934 – June 10, 2006) was an American diplomat, publisher, banker, and philanthropist.

== Career ==
Born Philip Merrill Levine, he was a graduate of Cornell University and Harvard Business School. At Cornell, he was managing editor of The Cornell Daily Sun and a member of the Quill and Dagger society. He was president and CEO of Capital-Gazette Communications, Inc., which publishes Washingtonian magazine, the Annapolis Capital, and five other Maryland newspapers. His wife, Eleanor, succeeded him as chairman of the company which they sold after his death to Landmark Communications; their daughter Catherine Merrill Williams took over as president and publisher of the Washingtonian.

Merrill served as counselor to the Undersecretary of Defense for Policy from 1981 to 1983; as a member of the Defense Policy Board from 1983 to 1990 and again from 2001 to 2003; and as Assistant Secretary General for Defence Support at NATO Headquarters in Brussels from 1990 to 1992 under President George H. W. Bush. He was appointed to chairman of the Export-Import Bank of the United States by George W. Bush, serving from 2002 to 2005. He represented the United States in negotiations on the Law of the Sea Conference, the International Telecommunication Union and various disarmament and exchange agreements with the former Soviet Union. For many years he chaired the White House Fellow Commissions regional panels. Merrill also served on President George H. W. Bush's Gulf War Air Power Survey and President Reagan's Commission on Cost Control in the Federal Government.

He served as a long time trustee of the Aspen Institute (and long time executive board member), the Chesapeake Bay Foundation, the Johns Hopkins University, and Cornell University. He was Chairman of the Center for Strategic and Budgetary Assessments (CSBA) and a U.S. Director of the International Institute of Strategic Studies (IISS). He also served on the Department of Defense Business Board, the University of Maryland Board of Visitors, Johns Hopkins School of Advanced International Studies (SAIS) board, the Smithsonian's National Museum of American History board, the Foundation for the National Archives, and the Advanced Physics Laboratories board.

In 1988, he received the Department of Defense Distinguished Civilian Service Award from the then Secretary of Defense Caspar Weinberger, the highest civilian honor given by the United States Department of Defense.

== Philanthropy ==
Merrill donated $7 million to the Chesapeake Bay Foundation. The building, the Phillip Merrill Center, was awarded the first LEED platinum certificate in the country.

In 2001, Merrill donated $10 million to the Philip Merrill College of Journalism at the University of Maryland, College Park.

Merrill donated $4 million in 2003 to create the Philip Merrill Center for Strategic Studies at the Paul H. Nitze School of Advanced International Studies (SAIS). Eliot A. Cohen is the director of the Merrill Center.

Merrill donated the funds to build the Cornell Sailing Center at Cornell University, which is named for the Merrill Family and was dedicated in 2009.

Merrill and his wife were benefactors of numerous institutions including the Aspen Institute, the Ford's Theater, Shakespeare Theater, the Meridian Center, the Barker Adoption Foundation and Columbia Lighthouse for the Blind.

The American Council of Trustees and Alumni annually awards The Philip Merrill Award for Outstanding Contributions to Liberal Arts Education.

== Death ==
Merrill disappeared while sailing alone on the Chesapeake Bay on June 10, 2006. He was initially believed to have been lost at sea, but his body was found on June 19. The medical examiner ruled Merrill's death a suicide.

Merrill was survived by his wife, Eleanor; three children, Douglas Merrill, Catherine Merrill Williams, and Nancy Merrill; and four grandsons.

Eleanor died ten years later on July 16, 2016 after sustaining injuries from a fall.
