= Anne D. Neal =

American lawyer

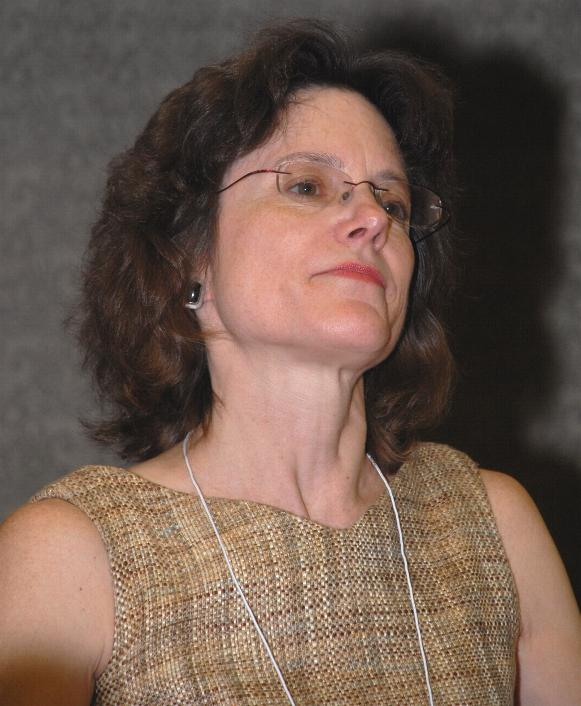
- Neal at a conference in June 2008
- Occupation: Former president of the American Council of Trustees and Alumni
- Spouse: Tom Petri

Anne deHayden Neal (born March 22, 1955) is the former president of the American Council of Trustees and Alumni (ACTA), a non-profit organization with a stated mission of advancing academic quality, accountability and affordability at colleges and universities in the United States.

== Early life ==
Neal spent her childhood in Indiana, where her father was the editor of the Noblesville Daily Ledger, a small-town newspaper. She graduated magna cum laude as a member of Phi Beta Kappa from Harvard College in 1977 with an A.B. in American history and literature. Neal earned her J.D. from Harvard Law School in 1980. Neal served as the first female editor of the Harvard Journal on Legislation.

== Career ==
Neal began her career as an attorney at the firm of Rogers & Wells in New York City, where she specialized in First Amendment law. She also served as an associate at Wiley Rein in Washington, D.C. Neal later served as senior vice president of corporate legal affairs for the Recording Industry Association of America where she was involved in the RIAA's campaign to oppose mandatory lyrics labeling.

In the early 1990s, Neal served as general counsel and congressional liaison for the National Endowment for the Humanities under Lynne V. Cheney, where she addressed issues including academic freedom, intellectual diversity, and historical literacy. Along with Cheney, Joe Lieberman, former Colorado governor Richard Lamm, former University of Colorado at Boulder president and U.S. Senator Hank Brown, Nobel Laureate Saul Bellow, and sociologist David Riesman, Neal co-founded the American Council of Trustees and Alumni (then known as the National Alumni Forum) in 1995. Neal served as vice president and general counsel of the organization from 1995–2003 before succeeding Jerry L. Martin as president in 2003.

In both 2007 and 2010, Neal was appointed to the National Advisory Committee on Institutional Quality and Integrity, an advisory body that makes recommendations to the United States Secretary of Education.

Neal’s writing has been published in the Washington Examiner, Inside Higher Ed, The Washington Post, and National Review Online. Neal has appeared on Fox Business News, CNN, Fox News, WGN-TV, and NPR.

Neal has testified before the Commission on the Future of Higher Education, the United States Senate Committee on Health, Education, Labor, and Pensions, the Louisiana Postsecondary Education Commission, and the California Advisory Committee to the U.S. Civil Rights Commission. She has presented at conferences sponsored by the American Enterprise Institute, the American Legislative Exchange Council (ALEC), the University of Notre Dame, the Foreign Policy Association, the Association of American Colleges and Universities, Montana State University, the American Association of University Professors and the Council for Higher Education Accreditation.

Neal serves on the boards of the Mount Vernon Ladies' Association, the United States Capitol Historical Society, and Casey Trees.

== Personal life ==
Neal is married to former U.S Congressman Tom Petri (R-Wisconsin). Their daughter is American humorist Alexandra Petri.
