= Michael Poliakoff =

American academic and educator

Michael B. Poliakoff is an American academic and educator who serves as president of the American Council of Trustees and Alumni (ACTA), a non-profit organization with a stated mission of advancing academic quality, academic freedom, accountability, and affordability at colleges and universities in the United States.

== Early life and education ==
Poliakoff spent his childhood in New Jersey before enrolling at Yale University, where he was on the wrestling team. He graduated magna cum laude with an undergraduate degree in classical studies in 1975. He then went on to attend the University of Oxford on a Rhodes Scholarship, where he earned Class I Honours in Literae humaniores. He then earned his Ph.D. in classical studies from the University of Michigan.

== Career ==
Poliakoff began his career as an assistant professor at Wellesley College before becoming a professor at Hillsdale College, where he founded the classics department and served as its chair.

In 1992, Poliakoff left full-time teaching to work at the National Endowment for the Humanities, although he continued to serve as a visiting or adjunct faculty member at George Washington University, Georgetown University, and George Mason University over the course of his career.

Poliakoff has held numerous positions throughout his career, including Deputy Secretary for Postsecondary and Higher Education at the Pennsylvania Department of Education, Director of the Division of Education Programs at the National Endowment for the Humanities, Vice President for Academic Affairs and Research at University of Colorado System.

In 2010, Poliakoff joined the American Council of Trustees and Alumni as Vice President of Policy. In 2016, Poliakoff succeeded Anne D. Neal, becoming the organization's third president.

== Select publications ==
=== Classical studies ===
- 1980 "Nectar, Springs, and the Sea: Critical Terminology in Pindar and Callimachus," Zeitschrift für Papyrologie und Epigraphik
- 1987 Combat Sports in the Ancient World: Competition, Violence, and Culture
- 1989 (German translation) Kampfsport in der Antike: Wettstreit, Gewalt, und Kultur
- 1991 "Roll Over Aristotle: Martin Bernal and His Critics," Academic Questions
- 1992 "Vergil’s Heart of Darkness: Observations on a Recurring Theme," Arion

=== Education policy ===
- 2014 Education or Reputation. A Look at America’s Top-Ranked Liberal Arts Colleges, with Armand Alacbay
- 2015 The Unkindest Cut. Shakespeare in Exile 2015, with ACTA staff
- 2015 The Cost of Chaos in the Curriculum, with Elizabeth Capaldi Phillips
- 2016 The Crisis of Civic Education, with William Gonch
- 2016 No U.S. History? How College History Departments Leave the United States out of the Major, with Drew Lakin and Marya Myers
- 2017 Campus Free Speech, Academic Freedom, and the Problem of the BDS Movement, with Joel Griffith
