= National Advisory Committee on Institutional Quality and Integrity =

The National Advisory Committee on Institutional Quality and Integrity (NACIQI, pronounced nah-SEEK-eeh) is an advisory body that makes recommendations to the U.S. secretary of education "on matters related to accreditation and to the eligibility and certification process for institutions of higher education." It recommends which accreditation agencies should be recognized by the Department of Education. Without the seal of approval of a recognized higher education accrediting body, colleges and universities cannot receive federal funds.

== Authority ==
NACIQI operates according to section 114 of the Higher Education Act, though this act was most recently amended by Section 106 of the Higher Education Opportunities Act in 2008. The statute details the areas in which the NACIQI should advise the secretary of education, and those areas are as follows:

- Establishing and enforcing accrediting criteria in the realm of higher education.
- Preparing and publishing a list of nationally recognized accredited institutions and agencies of higher education.
- Determining the eligibility and certifying institutions of higher education.
- Defining the relationship between the accreditation and certification of higher education institutions and state licensing practices with respect to institutions of higher education.

== History ==
NACIQI was established in 1992, under the Higher Education Amendments to the Higher Education Act of 1965. The Higher Education Opportunity Act of 2008 changed the structure of NACIQI from a 15 member committee appointed by the Secretary of Education to an 18 member committee appointed equally by the House, the Senate, and the Secretary of Education.

== Appointment ==
The National Committee on Institutional Quality and Integrity is composed of 18 members with varying terms in office. An equal number of members are appointed by the secretary of education, the House of Representatives, and the Senate. The breakdown of these appointees is as follows:

The secretary of education:

The secretary of education appoints 6 members for three-year terms. Of these 6 appointees, the secretary of state is also responsible for selecting the committee’s student member.

The House of Representatives:

The House of Representatives appoints 6 members for 4-year terms. While the appointees are ultimately chosen by the speaker of the House, the House majority leader and House minority leader are each responsible for presenting 3 recommended appointees to the speaker of the house.

The Senate:

The Senate appoints 6 members for 6-year terms in a similar fashion as the house of representatives. The Senate majority and minority leaders each present 3 recommended appointees and the president pro tempore is responsible for ultimately selecting the appointees.

== Membership composition ==
Republican appointees:

- Salvador Rodriguez Sanchez JR.,CA (Committee Chairman)
- Brian W. Jose
- Anne D. Neal, J.D.
- Richard F. O'Donnell
- Claude O. Pressbell Jr.
- Arthur J. Rothkopf, J.D.

Democratic appointees:

- Kathleen Sullivan Alioto, Ed.D
- Jill Derby, Ph.D.
- George T. French, Jr., Ph.D.
- Paul Leblanc Ph.D.
- Ralph Wolff, J.D.
- Steven Van Ausdle, Ph.D.

Department of Education appointees:

- Roberta L. (Bobbie) Derlin, Ph.D.
- John Etchemendy, Ph.D.
- Susan D. Phillips, Ph.D.
- Frank H. Wu, J.D.
- Frederico Zaragoza, Ph.D.

== See also ==
- Educational accreditation
