= Philip Merrill Award for Outstanding Contributions to Liberal Arts Education =

- Awarded for: Advancement of liberal arts education
- Location: Washington, District of Columbia
- Presented by: American Council of Trustees and Alumni
- First award: 2005
- Website: www.goacta.org

The Philip Merrill Award for Outstanding Contributions to Liberal Arts Education is an annual prize given by the American Council of Trustees and Alumni to an individual who has “made an extraordinary contribution to the advancement of liberal arts education, core curricula, and the teaching of Western civilization and American history.” The award is named for the late public servant, publisher, entrepreneur, and philanthropist Philip Merrill.

Merrill was a trustee of Cornell University, the University of Maryland Foundation, the Johns Hopkins School of Advanced International Studies, the Smithsonian National Museum of American History, and the Aspen Institute, as well as a member of the National Council of the American Council of Trustees and Alumni.

== Winners ==
- 2005: Robert P. George, McCormick Professor of Jurisprudence, Princeton University
- 2006: Harvey Mansfield, William R. Kenan Jr. Professor of Government, Harvard University
- 2007: Gertrude Himmelfarb, Professor Emerita, City University of New York
- 2008: Donald Kagan, Sterling Professor of History and Classics, Yale University
- 2009: KC Johnson, Professor of History, Brooklyn College
- 2010: Benno C. Schmidt Jr., Chairman of the Board of Trustees, City University of New York
- 2011: David McCullough, independent scholar
- 2012: Tom Rollins, founder of The Teaching Company
- 2013: Gary Gallagher, Professor of History, University of Virginia
- 2014: Louise Mirrer, president and CEO of the New York Historical
- 2015: Hank Brown, former Republican politician and U.S. Senator from Colorado who served as president of the University of Colorado system from April 2005 to January 2008.
- 2016: Niall Ferguson and Ayaan Hirsi Ali
- 2017: Robert Zimmer, President, University of Chicago
- 2018: Mitch Daniels, President, Purdue University
- 2019: José A. Cabranes, United States circuit judge of the United States Court of Appeals for the Second Circuit
- 2021: Dr. Gordon S. Wood, Professor of History Emeritus, Brown University
- 2022: John H. McWhorter, Columbia University Professor, Columbia University
- 2023: Alan Charles Kors, Henry Charles Lea Professor Emeritus of History at the University of Pennsylvania and Cofounder of the Foundation for Individual Rights and Expression.
- 2024: Nadine Strossen, John Marshall Harlan II Professor of Law Emerita, New York Law School and Past President, American Civil Liberties Union.
- 2025: Larry Summers, economist, former United States Secretary of the Treasury, and former president of Harvard University.
