= Alexandra Petri =

American humorist

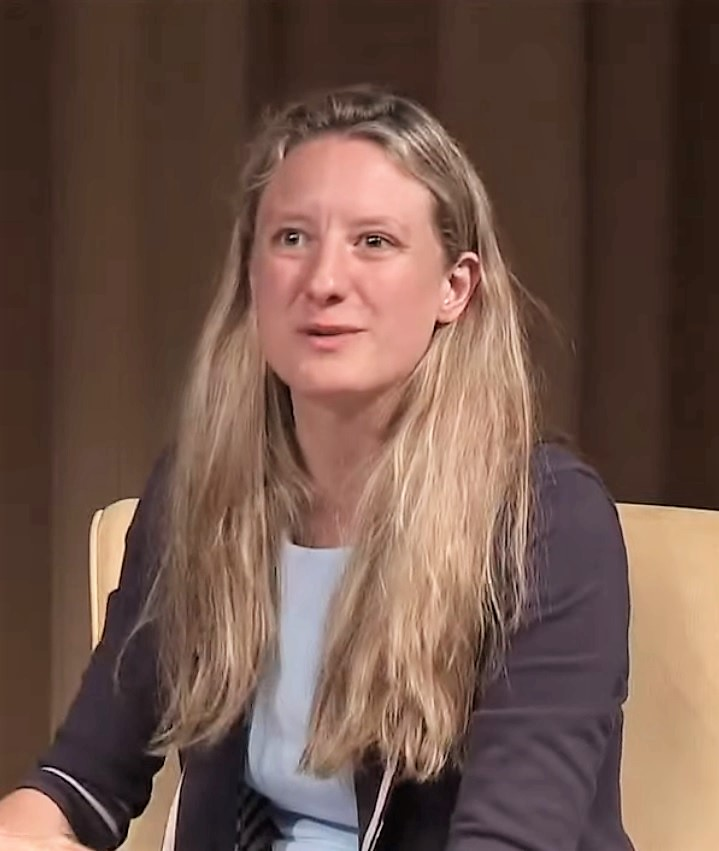
- Petri hosts a discussion at the National Archives and Records Administration in 2019
- Born: Alexandra Attkisson Petri; March 15, 1988 (age 38); Wisconsin, U.S.
- Education: Harvard University (BA)
- Occupations: Humorist and writer
- Spouse: Stephen Stromberg (m. 2018)
- Children: 2
- Parent(s): Tom Petri; Anne D. Neal

Alexandra Attkisson Petri (/ˈpiːtraɪ/, born March 15, 1988) is an American humorist, newspaper columnist, and 2024 recipient of the Thurber Prize for American Humor. In 2010, she became the youngest person to have a column in The Washington Post. Before joining The Atlantic in May 2025, Petri ran the ComPost blog on the paper's website, on which she formerly worked with Dana Milbank. In 2017, a piece of satire she wrote about president Donald Trump was miscategorized as news and included in one of the White House's daily press briefings. She was recognized in the Forbes 30 Under 30 in 2018.

== Biography ==
=== Early life and education ===
Petri grew up in Georgetown, Washington, D.C., the only child of Wisconsin congressman Tom Petri and nonprofit executive Anne D. Neal, and attended the National Cathedral School. In high school she wrote plays for a competition at Arena Stage; three of hers were chosen for performance. She also performed standup comedy. She graduated summa cum laude and Phi Beta Kappa from Harvard University with a degree in English, concentrating in classics, in 2010; while there she joined the Harvard Stand Up Comedy Society, worked with the Hasty Pudding Club, and wrote for the Internet comedy series On Harvard Time and for The Harvard Crimson. Her college roommate was Megan Amram. She was a summer intern at The Washington Post before she received a job with the paper. She is also a member of a playwrights' collective in Washington, D.C., called The Welders.

=== Career ===
Her book of essays, A Field Guide to Awkward Silences, was published in 2015. She has appeared on Jeopardy!, won prizes in the O. Henry Pun-Off, and performed at an international whistling competition. Her play The Campsite Rule, a sex comedy whose title is derived from an idea taken from Dan Savage, was premiered at the Capital Fringe Festival in 2013.

In December 2015, Petri created the parody Twitter account "Emo Kylo Ren", which envisioned the Star Wars: The Force Awakens character Kylo Ren as an angsty teenager obsessed with Darth Vader. The account went viral after being retweeted by Hot Topic and receiving attention from media outlets such as USA Today and People Magazine, soon gaining more followers than Hot Topic. During the 8th Shorty Awards in 2016, the account won the award for best parody account. Petri revealed that she created this parody account in an interview with Syfy published on January 25, 2018.

Of her writing, Petri has said, "My goal is to be weirder than everybody else and hope that no one stops me. So far no one has." Writers and comedians she has listed as influences include James Thurber, Dave Barry, Mitch Hedberg, Mark Twain, Oscar Wilde, and William Shakespeare.

She made her comic book debut by writing the one-shot She-Hulk Annual #1, released on August 28, 2019.

In June 2020, Petri released her second book, Nothing Is Wrong and Here Is Why, a collection of essays on the Trump presidency years. In April 2023, she released her third book Alexandra Petri's US History: Important American Documents (I Made Up), which won the Thurber Prize for American Humor. The Atlantic announced that it hired her in May 2025.

== Personal life ==
In June 2018, Petri married Stephen Stromberg, an editorial writer at the Washington Post. They welcomed their first child in February 2022. They welcomed their second child in January 2025.

== Works ==
- A Field Guide to Awkward Silences, New American Library, 2016. ISBN 9780451469618
- Nothing Is Wrong and Here is Why: Essays, W. W. Norton & Company, 2020. ISBN 9781324006459
- Alexandra Petri's US History: Important documents (I made up): Essays, W. W. Norton & Company, 2023. ISBN 9781324006435
