= Jerry L. Martin =

American theologian

Jerry L. Martin is the founding chairman of the Theology Without Walls group at the American Academy of Religion, editor of the book Theology Without Walls: The Transreligious Imperative, and author of God: An Autobiography, As Told to a Philosopher which was adapted into a podcast, titled God: An Autobiography, as told to a Philosopher - The Podcast, which takes the form of a dramatic conversation. From 1988 to 1995, Martin held senior positions at the National Endowment for the Humanities, including as acting chairman. From 1967 to 1982, Martin was a tenured professor and chairman of the philosophy department at the University of Colorado at Boulder, where he also served as the director of the university's Center for the Study of Values and Social Policy. He has testified before Congress and appeared on radio and television. Martin is chairman emeritus of the American Council of Trustees and Alumni (ACTA) after serving as president from its founding in 1995 as the National Alumni Forum until 2003, when he was succeeded by Anne D. Neal.

== Education ==
Martin earned a B.A. in political science at the University of California, Riverside, an M.A. in philosophy and political science at the University of Chicago, and a Ph.D. in philosophy at Northwestern University and a Doctor of Humane Letters from the Thomas More College of Liberal Arts. He has taught in the graduate programs at Georgetown University and the Catholic University of America.

== Career ==
From 1977 to 1979, he served as president of the Colorado Conference of the American Association of University Professors. In 1982, Martin was selected as an Andrew W. Mellon Congressional Fellow and worked on education, regulatory issues, and international trade on the staff of then-Congressman Hank Brown of Colorado until 1987. Martin has also held faculty positions at Georgetown University, The Catholic University of America, and the American Enterprise Institute.

In addition to his scholarly articles, Martin is author or co-author of major reports that have received national publicity. The report Losing America's Memory, has been cited in hundreds of newspaper articles, including full-page reports in the New York Times and Washington Post and discussion by Sam Donaldson and George Will on the Sunday news program, "This Week." Newspapers and television also gave nationwide coverage to The Shakespeare Files: What English Majors Are Really Studying and E Pluribus Unum. He has personally appeared on radio and television, including the BBC Radio 4 program, Something Understood.

His essay on the postmodern university appeared in The Imperiled Academy (Transaction) and was reprinted in Academic Questions and the Partisan Review. He also contributed essays to Studies in the Philosophy of Mind (Canadian Philosophical Association), The Core and the Canon: A National Debate (University of North Texas), Studies in the Quality of Life (University of Colorado), Innovative Models for University Research (North Holland), and Models of God and Other Alternative Ultimate Realities (Springer).

Martin has edited special issues on Theology Without Walls for the Journal of Ecumenical Studies and on transreligious theology for Open Theology.

He has been Andrew W. Mellon Congressional Fellow, Distinguished Annual Georgia Humanities Lecturer, and Bertram Morris Lecturer at the University of Colorado at Boulder. He served as state president of the American Association of University Professors and on the Governor's Blue Ribbon Commission on Higher Education in Virginia.

== Personal life ==
Martin has no current religious affiliation but was raised Protestant. He and his wife Abigail Martin (née Abigal L. Rosenthal), live in Doylestown, Pennsylvania, north of Philadelphia. Abigail, professor emerita of philosophy at Brooklyn College, is the author of Confessions of a Young Philosopher (forthcoming), A Good Look At Evil, and the blog "Dear Abbie: The Non-Advice Column".

== Selected publications ==
- Martin, Jerry L. (2020). Theology Without Walls The Transreligious Imperative. Taylor & Francis. ISBN 978-0-429-00097-3. OCLC 1302598102.
- Martin, Jerry L. (2016). God : an autobiography, as told to a philosopher. Doylestown, PA: Caladium. ISBN 978-0-9967253-1-6. OCLC 988525441.
