= On Harvard Time =

Harvard College students comedy news show

- Genre: Comedy
- Created by: Mia Walker, Kristina Dominguez, Derek Flanzraich, Michael Koenigs
- Country of origin: United States
- Original language: English
- No. of seasons: 5

Production
- Production locations: Cambridge, Massachusetts
- Running time: 7-10 minutes

Original release
- Network: Harvard Undergraduate Television
- Release: April 5, 2007 – present

On Harvard Time is a Harvard College student-run Internet comedy news show. Modeled after The Daily Show, it presents, comments, and satirizes Harvard College news in a comedic fashion. It has been considered one of Harvard Undergraduate Television's flagship shows since its founding by Mia Walker, Kristina Dominguez, Derek Flanzraich, and Michael Koenigs, in 2006.

== History and description ==
On Harvard Time produces weekly videos as well as periodic humorous interviews with both Harvard and national public figures, such as Harvard Dean of Admissions William Fitzsimmons, Deputy White House Chief of Staff Karl Rove, Aaron Sorkin, Jesse Eisenberg, Rainn Wilson, and 2008 U.S. Presidential candidate Mike Gravel. After losing its studio in 2014, On Harvard Time switched its focus to sketch comedy. On Harvard Time's November 2008 "Harvard Yale Aid" video, mocking Yale University before the annual Harvard-Yale football game, was named 2008 Ivy League Video of the Year by IvyGate Blog.

Among former writers for the series is current Washington Post columnist Alexandra Petri.

== Influence and controversy ==
On Harvard Time content has been cited in USA Today, Business Insider, Wonkette, Gawker and The New York Times Magazine.

A parody of Yale University's "That's Why I Chose Yale" admissions video sparked national outrage after The Yale Daily News criticized its treatment of a recent murder on the Yale campus. In response, On Harvard Time apologized and removed the reference.
