= Stephen Stromberg =

American journalist

Stephen Stromberg is politics and economics opinion editor at The New York Times and a former deputy opinion editor for The Washington Post. He was part of the Washington Post team that won the 2022 Pulitzer Prize in Public Service. He is among the senior Post journalists who left the paper in 2025, as publisher William Lewis and owner Jeff Bezos curbed the independence of its opinions section.

His work focuses on U.S. politics and government, healthcare, the environment and energy, but he is also one of the few American journalists to write about professional sumo wrestling. Before joining The Post, he covered American politics and economics for The Economist.

An Eagle Scout, he was raised as a Mormon and has written about Mormonism. He grew up in Los Angeles before attending Harvard University where he was editorial chair of the Harvard Crimson. He then attended Oxford University, where he was executive editor of the Oxonian Review.

He is married to former Post humor columnist Alexandra Petri, now a staff writer at The Atlantic, and lives in Washington, D.C.
