= American Council of Trustees and Alumni =

- Abbreviation: ACTA
- Formation: 1995
- Type: Nonprofit organization
- Headquarters: 1730 M Street NW, S-600
- Location: Washington, D.C.
- Coordinates: 38.90534°N 77.0392°W
- President: Michael Poliakoff
- Revenue: $6.13 million (2024)
- Expenses: $6.12 million (2024)
- Website: www.goacta.org

The American Council of Trustees and Alumni (ACTA) is an American non-profit organization whose stated mission is to "support liberal arts education, uphold high academic standards, safeguard the free exchange of ideas on campus, and ensure that the next generation receives a philosophically rich, high-quality college education at an affordable price."

ACTA primarily encourages trustees to take on a more assertive governing role. It is based in Washington, D.C., and its current president is Michael Poliakoff.

== History ==
ACTA was founded in 1995 as the National Alumni Forum by former National Endowment for the Humanities chairman Lynne V. Cheney, former Colorado governor Richard Lamm, then U.S. Senator and future University of Colorado at Boulder president Hank Brown, sociologist David Riesman, Nobel Laureate Saul Bellow, U.S. Senator Joe Lieberman, and former ACTA president Anne D. Neal. With the exception of Neal, all those involved in ACTA's founding have since retired. In 1996, the organization changed its name to the American Council of Trustees and Alumni. Jerry L. Martin, a former philosophy professor at the University of Colorado at Boulder, was president from the organization's founding until 2003, when Neal became president. In 2016, Michael Poliakoff, formerly vice president of policy at ACTA, took over as the organization's president.

== Organization ==
ACTA is a non-profit organization and is funded by grants from foundations and gifts from individuals. Foundations that have donated to ACTA include the Lynde and Harry Bradley Foundation, the John M. Olin Foundation and the Lumina Foundation for Education. Members of ACTA's board of directors include Mark Ridenour (chairman), Janice Rogers Brown (treasurer), Judith Messina (secretary), Edwin D. Williamson, Heidi Ganahl, Paul S. Levy, Karrin Taylor Robson, Stuart Taylor, Jr., Stephen Joel Trachtenberg, and Reuben Jeffery.

== Activities ==
ACTA's stated goals are to promote academic freedom, academic excellence, and accountability in higher education. ACTA promotes a substantial core curriculum, exposing college students to a broad range of ideas, for an active role for governing boards, and for greater transparency and accountability in higher education. According to ACTA, a university education should prepare its graduates to become "informed citizens, effective workers, and lifelong learners."

ACTA is a member of the advisory board of Project 2025, a collection of conservative and right-wing policy proposals from the Heritage Foundation to reshape the United States federal government and consolidate executive power should the Republican nominee win the 2024 presidential election.

=== Academic freedom ===
ACTA argues that students should be free to express their views on campus and states that it opposes campus speech codes. ACTA has spoken out against the dis-invitation of speakers and called on universities to use guest speakers to add to the mix of ideas.

Roger Bowen, the former general secretary of the American Association of University Professors, has criticized ACTA on the grounds that non-academics should not weigh in on academic questions.

ACTA has opposed the ban of Reserve Officers' Training Corps (ROTC) programs on campuses.

==== Free to Teach, Free to Learn ====
In April 2013, ACTA published a guide for trustees titled Free to Teach, Free to Learn: Understanding and Maintaining Academic Freedom in Higher Education. The guide reports on what it says is the decline of academic freedom and "intellectual diversity" on college campuses. Contributors to the guide include former Harvard University president Lawrence Summers, U.S. Circuit Judge José A. Cabranes, CUNY board chairman and former Yale professor Benno Schmidt, and Alan Charles Kors and Harvey Silverglate, co-founders of the Foundation for Individual Rights in Education.

=== Academic excellence ===
==== General education requirements ====
ACTA advocates for stronger general education requirements. According to ACTA, a core curriculum should include, at a minimum, courses in composition, literature, American history, foreign language, mathematics, science, and economics.

In 2003, ACTA published Degraded Currency: The Problem of Grade Inflation, a report dealing with grade inflation in American colleges and universities. The report stated that a larger percentage of students now get "A's" than ever before.

ACTA has also spoken out about the "beer and spectacle" climate at many universities, and the civic and economic illiteracy of college graduates. In 2000, ACTA published a report called Losing America's Memory: Historical Illiteracy in the 21st Century. The organization surveyed 556 randomly selected seniors at leading colleges and universities, including Harvard University, Princeton University, and Brown University. Students were asked 34 high-school level questions designed to test their historical literacy. One student answered all the questions correctly, and the average score was 53%. None of the 55 liberal arts colleges and universities surveyed included American history as a graduation requirement. The report also found that while students could easily identify pop culture icons, 65% of those surveyed failed the 34 question multiple-choice test on American history and government. The report led to the adoption of a joint unanimous resolution of Congress expressing “the importance and value of United States history” and calling on boards of trustees, college administrators and state officials to strengthen American history requirements.

ACTA has published reports evaluating the higher education systems in California, Minnesota, Illinois, Missouri, Georgia, North Carolina, Virginia, South Carolina, Maine, Idaho, Florida, and Mississippi.

==== What Will They Learn? ====
Since 2009, ACTA has published an annual report entitled What Will They Learn? The report, which includes data from over 1,100 four-year institutions, assigns a letter grade to each university based on how many of the following seven core subjects are required: composition, literature, foreign language, American history, economics, mathematics and science. ACTA concludes that most of the country's leading universities do not have rigorous general education requirements.

In the 2009-2010 report, 42 institutions received a “D” or an “F” for requiring two or fewer subjects. Only 5 institutions received an “A” for requiring six subjects and none required all seven. In the 2011-2012 edition, 19 schools received an "A" grade for requiring at least six of the subjects the study evaluated. In the 2012-2013 edition, 21 schools received an "A" grade. The 2013-2014 edition of the report awarded 22 "A" grades, while the 2014-2015 edition awarded 23 "A" grades." The 2015-2016 edition of the report awarded 24 "A" grades. The 2016-2017 edition assigned 25 "A" grades.

The report has been endorsed by Mel Elfin, founder of the U.S. News & World Report College Rankings. The New York Times higher education blogger Stanley Fish agreed that universities ought to have a strong core curriculum, but disagreed with some of the subjects ACTA includes in the core.

==== Phillip Merrill Award ====
Each year, ACTA gives out the Philip Merrill Award for Outstanding Contributions to Liberal Arts Education. This award “honors individuals who advance liberal arts education, core curricula, and the teaching of Western civilization and American history." Award winners have included Robert David “KC” Johnson, professor of history at Brooklyn College; Benno Schmidt, chairman of the Board of Trustees of City University of New York; historian David McCullough; Tom Rollins, founder of the Teaching Company; and Robert Zimmer, president of the University of Chicago.

==== Jerry L. Martin Prize ====
ACTA gives out the Jerry L. Martin Prize for Excellence in College Trusteeship on an occasional basis. Named after ACTA's first president, the prize honors trustees who have contributed to liberal education and best practices at their institutions. Award winners have included Charles T. (Tom) McMillen, regent, University System of Maryland, and former U.S. representative; Paul S. Levy, Trustee Emeritus, University of Pennsylvania Board of Trustees; Wallace Hall, regent, University of Texas System; and Karrin Taylor Robson, regent, Arizona State University.

=== Accountability ===
==== Governance ====
To address the problems it says exist in higher education, ACTA calls on university governing boards to exert oversight in order to hold administrations and professors accountable. ACTA argues for a much more active approach to trusteeship than the Association of Governing Boards. ACTA president Anne D. Neal cited the Penn State sex abuse scandal as an example of university trustees failing to exert adequate oversight, writing, "The institutional reckoning must begin and end with the governing board. It is responsible for the actions of university leaders, and its members owe taxpayers and students accountability and transparency." In 2012, ACTA presented the Penn State Board of Trustees with a recommendation for changes in the board's structure and operations.

On the financial front, ACTA calls on governing boards to keep costs under control—in particular administrative spending—and not to reflexively increase tuition. ACTA has also spoken out on the need to raise graduation rates as a cost-saving measure.

In December 2012, ACTA, representing a group of trustees and alumni from across the nation, sought an investigation by the U.S. Department of Education into an accreditation agency's decision to put the University of Virginia on warning for a failed attempt to fire president Teresa A. Sullivan. ACTA president Anne Neal wrote, "We believe there is substantial reason to believe that the accreditor has inappropriately become involved in a power struggle between the president, faculty, and the board of trustees and urge you to investigate." On December 11, 2012, the Southern Association of Colleges and Schools' Commission on College sent a warning notice to the University of Virginia regarding governance issues. Neal wrote, "It appears that SACS' real issue is not the absence of a board policy, but the substance of the board's policy." In an interview, Neal said she wanted the Department of Education to put the accrediting agency on notice that its proper role is to ensure educational quality "and not to intrude on the governance processes of our colleges and universities." The Department of Education determined that the Southern Association of Colleges had not violated federal laws. In March 2013, Neal challenged the ruling, writing, "SACS’ action falls outside its legitimate authority and amounts to the wielding of federal power in clear violation of the principles of federalism and the U.S. Constitution."

In January 2019, ACTA launched the website HowCollegesSpendMoney.com, which takes data from the National Center for Education Statistics and makes it transparent for a lay audience. The product is aimed towards trustees and alumni to show them how colleges' spending on administration has increased relative to spending on instruction over time.

==== Accreditation ====
ACTA has been a vocal critic of the current system of federal educational accreditation, arguing that the system as it is structured today pays no attention to the quality of the education that students receive (learning outcomes) and hampers the transfer of credits between institutions. In 2007, ACTA published a study on accreditation reform entitled Why Accreditation Doesn't Work and What Policy Makers Can Do About It. The study, a revised and updated version of a 2002 study entitled Can College Accreditation Live up to Its Promise? concluded that "accreditation does nothing to ensure educational quality" and that "the system of college accreditation has done more to raise costs than to improve or even maintain educational quality, and that it gives students, parents, and public decision-makers almost no useful information about institutions of higher education."

In June 2013, ACTA president Anne Neal provided testimony at a hearing conducted by the U.S. House of Representatives' Subcommittee on Higher Education and Workforce Training. The hearing was titled "Keeping College Within Reach: Program Quality through Accreditation." According to See Thru Ed, "Neal provided devastating testimony... before Congress that points to the continuing failure of college accreditors to support true incentives that would enhance academic quality and student achievement."

In September 2013, Hank Brown, who serves on ACTA's Accreditation Reform Initiative, published a paper titled "Protecting Students and Taxpayers: The Federal Government's Failed Regulatory Approach and Steps for Reform." Brown wrote that the nation's accreditation system is a "public policy and regulatory failure by almost any measure." U.S. News & World Report wrote that "Brown argues that lawmakers should consider reforms ranging from expanding the number of accrediting agencies to separating an institution's eligibility for federal funding from the accreditation process." Publication of the paper included a cosponsored panel with the American Enterprise Institute.

==== Graduation rates ====
In 2013, ACTA reviewed data from 1,070 fully accredited public and private colleges, finding that 40% of the included schools graduated less than half of their students in six years. More than 13% of the schools had graduation rates of 33 percent or less.
