= Louise Mirrer =

American historian

Louise Mirrer is an American historian who is president and CEO of the New York Historical.

== Biography ==
Mirrer was born in Brooklyn Heights. Her father, Dr. Gerald Mirrer, an internist, was one of the founding doctors of North Shore Hospital on Long Island, and her mother, Mildred, was a historian and educator. She graduated from the University of Pennsylvania, where her thesis concerned the cult of the Virgin Mary. She later earned a Ph.D. in the Spanish language and a Ph.D. in humanities from Stanford University. She taught in the Spanish departments at Fordham University and the University of Minnesota; at the latter institution, she became vice provost for arts, sciences, and engineering. She then became executive vice chancellor for academic affairs at the City University of New York.

She was named president of the New York Historical in 2004. Exhibits launched by the New-York Historical Society under Mirrer's direction include Slavery in New York; New York Divided: Slavery and the Civil War; A New Light on Tiffany: Clara Driscoll and the Tiffany Girls; French Founding Father: Lafayette's Return to Washington's America; Grant and Lee in War and Peace; Lincoln and New York, Nueva York. Mirrer has also overseen the expansion of its educational offerings, and its 2025 rebrand. The Center for Women's History at the museum was opened in 2016.

Mirrer is married to David Halle, a sociologist, and has three children. She lives in a maisonette on Beekman Place.

== Honors ==
- YWCA Women Achievers Award, 2000
- Citation of Honor, Queens Borough President's Office, 2001
- Women Making History Award, Queensborough Community College, 2001
- Leadership Award, Asian-American Research Institution, 2003
- New York Post's 50 Most Influential Women in New York, 2003
- Woman of Distinction Medal, League of Women Voters (2007)
- Philip Merrill Award for Outstanding Contributions to Liberal Arts Education, ACTA, 2014;

In 2007 she was made an honorary fellow of Wolfson College, Cambridge.
