= Tom Petri =

American politician (born 1940)

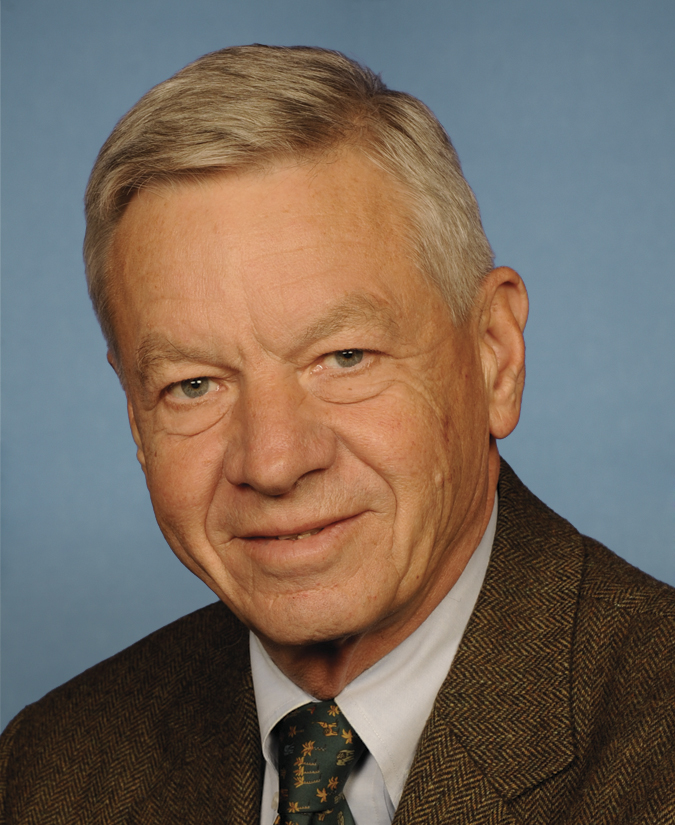

Member of the U.S. House of Representatives from Wisconsin's 6th district
- In office April 3, 1979 – January 3, 2015
- Preceded by: Bill Steiger
- Succeeded by: Glenn Grothman

Member of the Wisconsin Senate from the 2nd district
- In office January 8, 1973 – April 3, 1979
- Preceded by: Myron Lotto
- Succeeded by: Don Hanaway

Personal details
- Born: Thomas Evert Petri; May 28, 1940 (age 86) Marinette, Wisconsin, U.S.
- Party: Republican
- Spouse: Anne Neal
- Children: Alexandra
- Education: Harvard University (AB, JD)
- Petri's voice Petri honoring Charles Johnson, retiring House parliamentarian. Recorded May 20, 2004

Thomas Evert Petri (born May 28, 1940) is an American attorney and politician who was the U.S. representative for Wisconsin's 6th congressional district from 1979 to 2015; he is a member of the Republican Party.

== Early life ==
Petri was born in Marinette, Wisconsin. When he was a toddler, his father, a Navy flyer and lieutenant during World War II, was lost during a mission over the Atlantic. Petri, his infant brother, and his widowed mother moved to Fond du Lac, where Petri's mother taught in the Fond du Lac public schools. He represented his high school as a delegate to the youth government and leadership program Badger Boys State in 1957.

He graduated from Goodrich High School in Fond du Lac. Petri then attended Harvard University, where he received his Bachelor of Arts and Bachelor of Laws degrees. After graduating from law school he served as a law clerk to federal district judge James Doyle.

He was one of the founders of the Ripon Society, a public policy organization aligned with the Republican Party.

He served as a volunteer with the Peace Corps in Somalia from 1966 to 1967. From 1969 to 1970 he served as a White House aide during the Presidency of Richard Nixon.

== Early political career ==
=== Wisconsin Senate ===
Petri served in the Wisconsin State Senate from 1973 to 1979.

=== 1974 U.S. Senate election ===
Petri ran for the U.S. Senate in 1974. He easily won the Republican primary with 85% of the vote. During the campaign, Petri walked across the state of Wisconsin as part of his grassroots strategy. In the general election, incumbent Democratic U.S. Senator Gaylord Nelson defeated Petri 62%–36%. Petri took five of 72 counties in the state.

== U.S. House of Representatives ==
=== Elections ===
In 1979, he won a special election to finish the term of the late U.S. Congressman William A. Steiger, who had died shortly after being re-elected in 1978. He defeated fellow state senator Gary Goyke by only 1,200 voters. He won the seat in his own right in 1980, taking 57 percent of the vote in a rematch with Goyke.

Petri was reelected 16 times. The only time he faced a race anywhere near as close as his 1979 contest came in 1992. That year, he defeated State Representative Peg Lautenschlager 53% to 47%. It would be the only reelection contest in which he won less than 65 percent of the vote. He won ten of the district's thirteen counties. He lost Manitowoc, Brown, and Outagamie counties. He ran unopposed in 1990, 1994, 2002, and 2006. He faced no major-party opposition in 1986 and 1998. In April 2014, Petri announced he would not seek re-election in November 2014.

=== Tenure ===
Petri was a member of the Republican Main Street Partnership and supports stem-cell research, although he generally opposes abortion. He called for a moratorium on the death penalty, but voted against other restrictions on it. Petri was a member of the moderate Tuesday Group conference of Republicans, and received $10,000 from the group in 2008 and $5,000 in 2012.

Petri was the author and sponsor of three surface transportation laws. He supported the laws that eliminated the 55-miles-per-hour speed limit and eliminated the Interstate Commerce Commission.

Petri's three largest contributors in the 2012 campaign cycle were labor unions. He voted for Project Labor Agreements (PLAs) and twice voted to allow the use of PLAs in government contracts. Petri also voted to permit the use of taxpayer funds to comply with the Davis-Bacon Act, voted to use federal funds for collective bargaining by the Transportation Security Administration, and voted in favor of $233 million in taxpayer funding for the National Labor Relations Board.

In 1994, Petri introduced H.R. 4469, "The Multicare Act of 1994". This bill would have established federally funded government-run health insurance programs, and would have authorized states to require an individual to purchase insurance from one of these government-run insurance plans. Petri continued to push for the passage of Multicare until 2004.

In 2005, Petri voted to fund the "Gravina Island Bridge", and voted to prevent the drilling for oil in Arctic National Wildlife Refuge.

In 2005, Petri introduced the Direct Loan Reward Act, and in 2006 introduced the Student Aid Reward (STAR) Act.

On November 2, 2005, Petri voted against the Online Freedom of Speech Act.

On January 18, 2007 Petri voted in favor of HR 6, which made it more difficult to obtain a lease to drill for oil domestically.

Petri endorsed Mitt Romney in the 2008 GOP presidential primary. He subsequently endorsed John McCain in the 2008 presidential election.

In 2011, Petri sponsored an amendment to allow Michigan-based Badger Ferry to continue operating on Lake Michigan dumping more than 500 tons of coal ash a year into the lake. He had received $14,751 in campaign donations from executives of Lake Michigan Carferry, the owner of Badger Ferry. The Environmental Protection Agency and Badger Ferry came to agreement in 2013 to modifying coal-dumping procedures within two years. Badger Ferry, the oldest continuously operating coal ferry in the United States, announced in 2015 that is would continue operating without dumping coal in Lake Michigan.

On August 1, 2011, Petri voted for the Budget Control Act of 2011, which raised the nation's debt limit and created the United States Congress Joint Select Committee on Deficit Reduction.

Petri headed the Congressional British-American Parliamentary Exchange Group, which coordinated annual meetings between members of Congress and Parliament.

In the 112th Congress and the 113th Congress, Petri introduced the ExCEL Act, which would have created a universal income-contingent student loan repayment process, where students repaid loans based on their after college earnings. Petri's bill received bipartisan and bicameral support.

In 2012, Petri introduced H.R. 4148, the Fox-Wisconsin Heritage Parkway National Heritage Area Act of 2012, which would place 1,444 square miles of land in Wisconsin under the control of the federal government.

In 2014, Petri was investigated for advocating for a constituent company, Oshkosh Corporation, in which he held stock. He was also under scrutiny in regard to another Wisconsin-based business, The Manitowoc Company, in which he had a financial interest. Although the Office of Congressional Ethics found reason to believe Petri violated House rules and standards, the House Ethics Committee disagreed, voting not to impose sanctions on him.

=== Committee assignments (2013–2015) ===
- Committee on Education and Labor
  - Subcommittee on Early Childhood, Elementary and Secondary Education
  - Subcommittee on Higher Education and Workforce Training
- Committee on Transportation and Infrastructure
  - Subcommittee on Aviation
  - Subcommittee on Highways and Transit (Chair)

Caucus memberships

- Congressional Arts Caucus

== Electoral history ==
Wisconsin's 6th congressional district: Results 1980–2012
Year	Republican	Votes	%	Democratic	Votes	%	Third Party	Party	Votes	%	Third Party	Party	Votes	%	Third Party	Party	Votes	%
1979	Tom Petri	71,715	50%	Gary R. Goyke	70,492	50%												
1980	Tom Petri	129,574	57%	Gary R. Goyke	98,628	43%												
1982	Tom Petri	111,348	65%	Gordon Loeher	59,922	35%												
1984	Tom Petri	170,271	76%	David Iaquinta	54,266	24%												
1986	Tom Petri	124,328	97%	No candidate			John Daggett	Independent	4,268	3%								
1988	Tom Petri	165,923	74%	Joseph Garrett	57,552	26%												
1990	Tom Petri	111,036	100%	No candidate														
1992	Tom Petri	143,875	53%	Peggy Lautenschlager	128,232	47%												
1994	Tom Petri	119,384	99%	No candidate			Scattering		603	1%								
1996	Tom Petri	169,213	73%	Floyd Brenholt	55,377	24%	James Dean	Libertarian	4,494	2%	Timothy Farness	U.S. Taxpayers	2,532	1%	Scattering		103	0%
1998	Tom Petri	144,144	93%	No candidate			Timothy Farness	U.S. Taxpayers	11,267	7%								
2000	Tom Petri	179,205	65%	Dan Flaherty	96,125	35%												
2002	Tom Petri	169,834	99%	No candidate			Scattering		1,327	1%								
2004	Tom Petri	238,620	67%	Jef Hall	107,209	30%	Carol Rittenhouse	Green	10,018	3%								
2006	Tom Petri	201,367	99%	No candidate			Scattering		2,190	1%								
2008	Tom Petri	221,875	64%	Roger Kittelson	126,090	36%												
2010	Tom Petri	183,271	71%	Joe Kallas	75,926	29%												
2012	Tom Petri	223,460	62%	Joe Kallas	135,921	38%	Scattering		364	0%								

== Honors ==
Petri was honored by U.S. English, Inc. in May 2008 for his votes and co-sponsorships of official English legislation in the 110th Congress. Petri had previously sponsored legislation declaring English an official language in 1999.

=== Foreign honors ===
In 2014, Petri received the Order of the Rising Sun, Gold and Silver Star, Japan's second highest civilian honor, for his work to improve relations between the United States and Japan.

In 2015, Petri was made an honorary officer in the Order of the British Empire (OBE) for his work on trans-Atlantic issues.

== Personal life ==
Petri and his wife, nonprofit executive Anne D. Neal, are the parents of American humorist Alexandra Petri.

=== Political reform ===
After leaving office, he became involved in political reform efforts, including joining nine other former members of Congress to co-author a 2021 opinion editorial advocating reforms of Congress.

Party political offices
Preceded by Jerris Leonard	Republican nominee for U.S. Senator from Wisconsin (Class 3); 1974	Succeeded by Bob Kasten
U.S. House of Representatives
Preceded by Bill Steiger	Member of the U.S. House of Representatives from Wisconsin's 6th congressional district 1979–2015	Succeeded by Glenn Grothman
U.S. order of precedence (ceremonial)
Preceded by Joe Barton as Former U.S. Representative	Order of precedence of the United States as Former U.S. Representative	Succeeded by Jim Cooper as Former U.S. Representative
