= Ripon Society =

U.S. public policy organization and think tank

The Ripon Society
- Formation: December 12, 1962; 63 years ago
- Type: Public policy think tank
- Legal status: Non-profit
- Purpose: Advocacy
- Headquarters: 1155 15th Street, NW, S-550
- Location: Washington, D.C.
- Region served: United States
- Members: Private persons
- Official language: English
- President: Jim Conzelman
- Affiliations: The Ripon Forum magazine
- Revenue: $3,448,349 (2014)
- Expenses: $1,955,099 (2014)
- Website: www.riponsociety.org

The Ripon Society is an American center-right Republican public policy organization and think tank based in Washington, D.C. It publishes The Ripon Forum, the U.S.'s longest running Republican thought and opinion journal, as well as The Ripon Advance, a daily news publication.

Founded in 1962 in Cambridge, Massachusetts, the Society's name comes from the 1854 birthplace of the Republican Party—Ripon, Wisconsin. The Society's goals include protecting national security, lowering taxes, and shrinking the size of the government.

The Ripon Society was the first major Republican organization to support passage of the Civil Rights Act in the 1960s. In 1967, it advanced the concept of a negative income tax. In the early 1970s, it called for the normalization of relations with China, and the abolition of the military draft.

When many young people fear that their ideas cannot have an impact in American politics, the members of the Ripon Society have effectively proven otherwise. By thinking long and hard about public programs and by arguing its positions in a vigorous and reasonable manner, the Ripon Society has notably enriched our political dialogue.

— President Richard Nixon's statement
about the Ripon Society
January 23, 1970

== History ==
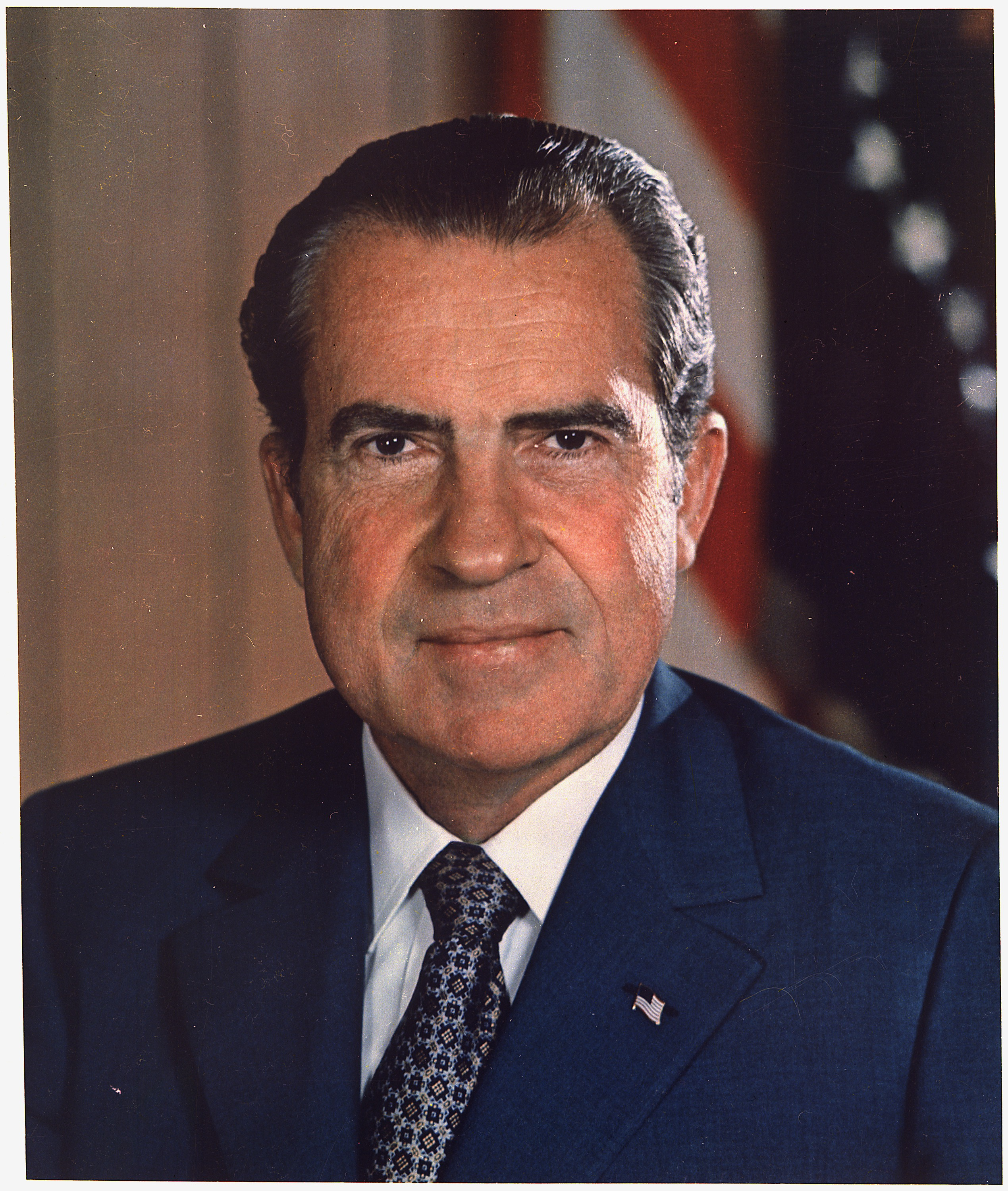
President Richard M. Nixon

President George H. W. Bush

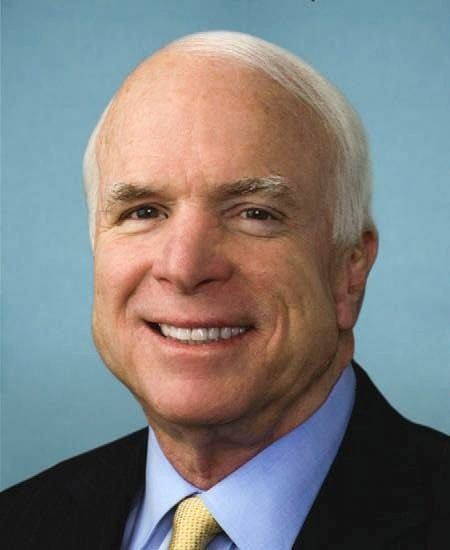
U.S. Senator John McCain

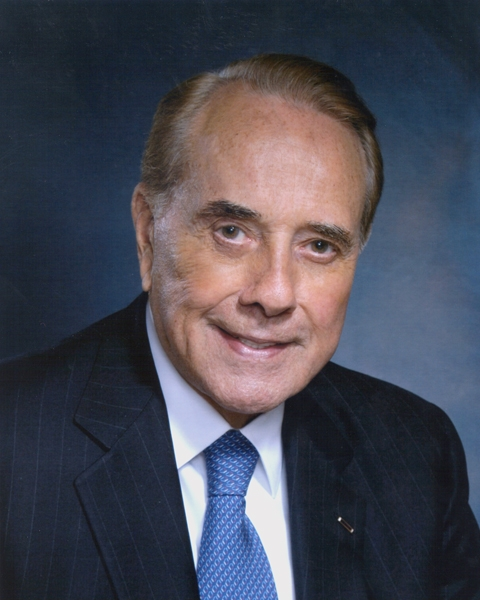
U.S. Senator Bob Dole

Two U.S. presidents and Republican presidential nominees have written guest articles in The Ripon Forum.

The 1994 Contract with America is a moment worth remembering because it was also a time when the GOP loudly and proudly proclaimed not what they stood against, but what they stood for.

— Lou Zickar, Ripon Society

=== Founding ===
==== Emil Frankel and the Bow Group ====
Emil Frankel was a Harvard law student in the early 1960s. He had studied in England on a Fulbright scholarship. While in England, he met members of a group called the Bow Group. The Bow Group founders had been "dissatisfied with the Conservative Party's image as 'the Stupid Party'." The Bow Group impressed Frankel, particularly regarding the level of detail that its members applied to study public policy problems and the proactive way its members became experts on policy topics.

At the same time John S. Saloma III was a professor at Massachusetts Institute of Technology. Like Frankel, Saloma had studied in England on a Fulbright scholarship. Both Frankel and Saloma became editors at Advance magazine.

In December 1962, Frankel and Saloma "circulated a confidential 'Proposal for an American Bow Group'". Saloma and Frankel held a meeting on December 12, 1962, in Cambridge, Massachusetts, at Harvard College. The meeting would become the first meeting of the group that eventually became known as the Ripon Society. The name is a reference to Ripon, Wisconsin, the informal birthplace of the Republican Party. (The town's claim was disputed by Jackson, Michigan, where the first official meeting of the Party was held; but a Republican organization was unlikely to name itself "The Jackson Society").

The society's meetings took place monthly at locations around Harvard. Some sixty individuals attended at least one Ripon meeting during its first year, and about half became active members. Most were graduate or professionals students and young professors from Harvard, M.I.T., and the Fletcher School of Law and Diplomacy at Tufts. The members of the Ripon Society were primarily white, middle-class, and a majority of members were from the Midwest.

==== A Call to History ====
On November 22, 1963, a group of Ripon Society members were having lunch in a dining hall at Harvard University. During lunch, they were planning a trip to campaign for Nelson Rockefeller for president, who was at that time the Republican governor of New York. Near the end of their lunch meeting, the members got word that President John F. Kennedy had been shot.

Political historian and author Geoffrey Kabaservice writes, "Although they (the Ripon Society members) were Republicans, JFK had been their political inspiration. When the news confirmed that Kennedy had been killed, they were caught between grief for their fallen hero and fear of Lyndon Johnson, who succeeded to the presidency".

Over the weeks following Kennedy's death, the Ripon members wrote a manifesto, "A Call to Excellence in Leadership: An Open Letter to the New Generation of Republicans." Newspapers around the U.S. published highlights of the manifesto. The New York Herald Tribune published it in full. The media attention given to the "Call to Excellence" thrust Ripon onto the national stage. The Washington Star was one newspaper that editorially hailed the Society as "a new voice in the land ... a voice that ought to be heeded."

Another voice was President (and Republican) Dwight D. Eisenhower, who wrote "my delight that an obviously intelligent group of people has taken the trouble to voice its consensus on this important subject, and also to express my basic agreement in the mainstream of its thinking."

==== The Ripon Papers ====
The Ripon Society wrote its first public statement in the weeks that followed Kennedy's assassination and published the statement on January 6, 1964:

While we yet sorrow, so must we seize this moment before our thoughts slip away to be lost in the noise of 'life as usual.' It is in this context that we have chosen to speak. We speak as a group of young Republicans to that generation which must bear the responsibility for guiding our party and our country over the coming decades. We speak for a point of view in the Republican Party that has too long been silent.

We believe that the future of our party lies not in extremism, but in moderation. The moderate course offers the Republican Party the best chance to build a durable majority position in American politics. This is the direction the party must take if it is to win the confidence of the "new Americans" who are not at home in the politics of another generation: the new middle classes of the suburbs of the North and West – who have left the Democratic cities but have not yet found a home in the Republican party; the young college graduates and professional men and women of our great university centers – more concerned with "opportunity" than "security", the moderate of the new South – who represent the hope for peaceful racial adjustment and who are insulted by a racist appeal more fitting another generation. These and others like them hold the key to the future of our politics.

We believe that the Republican Party should accept the challenge to fight for the middle ground of American politics. The party that will not acknowledge this political fact of life and courageously enter the contest for power does not merit and cannot possibly win the majority support of the American people.

=== John Saloma, founding president ===
The first president of the society was John S. Saloma III, serving from 1963 until 1967. In 1962, Saloma founded the American Bow Group, a society of university intellectuals. In 1963, the American Bow Group became the Ripon Society.

Saloma attended MIT and the London School of Economics. He received his doctorate from Harvard University with his dissertation "British Conservatism and the Welfare State".

In his career, Saloma's work focused mainly on the American political party system. Participating in a project studying the U.S. Congress sponsored by the American Political Science Association and the Carnegie Foundation, he published Congress and the New Politics in 1969 which dealt with the workloads in the offices of members of Congress. This led to an interest in the congressional budget process and the possibilities of computer use in the daily job of a representative. He died on July 6, 1983, in San Francisco, California.

Other founding members include Tom Petri, a U.S. congressman, and Lee Huebner.

=== Former leaders ===
- Auspitz, Josiah Lee
- Frenzel, Bill. Chairman Emeritus. Former U.S. Congressman.
- Dubke, Michael
- Gerstell, Glenn S.
- Gillette, Howard F. National president 1971–1972.
- Huebner, Lee. Co-founder and former president. Former special assistant to President Nixon.
- Kellogg, Frederick R.
- Kessler, Rick. From 2004 to 2009, Rick Kessler served as the Ripon Society's president. When he retired from the position in 2009, he became the group's president emeritus. Kessler began working for the group in 1981 as the executive director. Previously, he worked on the presidential campaign of John Anderson and served on the inaugural committee for newly elected President Ronald Reagan in 1980–1981.
- Leach, Jim. U.S. Congressman from Iowa.
- Petri, Tom. U.S. Congressman from Wisconsin. Co-founder.
- Saloma III, John S. Founding President.
- Smith, Peter, U.S. Congressman from Vermont.

=== 1964 Presidential campaign ===
A Slate article in 1998 attributed the Ripon's founding, in part, to "Republicans put off by the vulgarity of the Goldwater campaign ..." In 1964, conservative activists within the Republican Party nominated Barry Goldwater for president. The Ripon Society argued against Goldwater, writing:

We believe that the future of our party lies not in extremism, but in moderation. The moderate course offers the Republican Party the best chance to build a durable majority position in American politics. This is the direction the party must take if it is to win the confidence of the 'new Americans' who are not at home in the politics of another generation: the new middle classes of the suburbs of the North and West – who have left the Democratic cities but have not yet found a home in the Republican party; the young college graduates and professional men and women of our great university centers – more concerned with 'opportunity' than 'security'; the moderates of the new South – who represent the hope for peaceful racial adjustment and who are insulted by a racist appeal more fitting another generation. These and others like them hold the key to the future of our politics.

== Journals and publications ==
=== Ripon Forum ===
The Ripon Forum, a magazine that features articles from a variety of contributors, is published quarterly by the Ripon Society. It has been described as "... the only national magazine expressing a progressive Republican view."

=== Ripon Advance ===
The Ripon Advance is a daily publication that provides news and information about public policy and highlights the work of state and federal elected officials.

== Summary of major historical events ==
The Ripon Society has played a role in major political and policy events in America since the 1960s
Year	Event or Issue	Image	Details
1966	Military draft		In 1966, the society publicly announced its support of stopping the U.S. military draft at the conclusion of the Vietnam War. The society published an essay on its ideas for ending the draft. Ideas included increasing military salaries, paying volunteers higher salaries than draftees, and getting rid of "irrelevant induction standards to increase the flow of volunteers."
1967	Negative income tax		In 1967, Ripon proposed a new tax overhaul plan. Certain families would not pay taxes; instead, the government would send payments to the families. To qualify, families had to have low incomes. At the time, the proposed income cutoff was $6,000 (equivalent to $42,000 in 2014 dollars). Ripon released a report detailing the proposal. In the report, the society said, "The negative income tax encourages families to move up the income scale until they can begin to pay positive income taxes."
1970	Changes to GOP's "Southern Strategy"		During President Nixon's first term, the Ripon Society publicly asked Nixon to change the Republican Party's political tactics by getting rid of what was known as the "southern strategy." The Society arrived at this position because George Wallace had won the vote in Alabama, and the Society believed that Wallace's victory "killed it [the southern strategy] as a national tactic", the Kentucky New Era wrote in 1970.
1970	Senatorial rating system		In 1970, the Society created its first system to rate Members of Congress' voting records. The system rated the votes of U.S. Senators on key issues. The Society said that the goal of the rating system was to help people distinguish between liberal and conservative politicians. In that first year of rating, two senators received a near-perfect rating record: Senator Charles A. Goodell (R-NY) and Senator John Sherman Cooper (R-KY). The rating system was based on 29 specific roll call votes in the U.S. Senate.
1971	Interior Secretary Hickel "Man of the Year"		In November 1970, President Nixon fired his Secretary of the Interior, Walter J. Hickel. In April 1971, the Ripon Society gave Hickel the Ripon Society Man of the Year award. The Society made its decision by looking at the results of a poll it had taken of the readers of its magazine, The Ripon Forum.
1972	George Romney, Republican of the Year		In 1972, the Ripon Society awarded George Romney the Ripon Society "Republican of the Year" award. George Romney is Mitt Romney's father. At that time, George Romney served in as Secretary of Housing and Urban Development. The Society used a number of criteria when selecting Romney. For example, the Society supported Romney's work in the areas of "new housing, metropolitan planning, and federal revenue sharing with state and local governments," according to the Rome News-Tribune.
1976	President Ford's reelection		In 1976, the Society publicly denounced the idea of President Gerald Ford picking John Connally as Ford's running mate in the 1976 presidential election. "[He] might as well just nominate Rose Mary Woods."
1981	Nuclear sanctions		In 1981, the Ripon Society voiced public support for sanctions on nuclear-exporting countries. The society asked President Reagan to sanction any nation that sold weapons-grade nuclear materials or facilities.
1984	Republican party direction		In 1984, Congressman Jim Leach, who served as head of the Ripon Society at the time, held a press conference on Capitol Hill. At the press conference, Leach said that the Republican Party had been the first party to endorse the Equal Rights Amendment; that the party was founded on the "Lincolnian notion that rights, to be valid, must be color-blind"; and that the party had historically been supportive of the separation of church and state. As the Milwaukee Journal characterized it, "Leach ... had some rough words for the GOP."
1985	George H. W. Bush, Republican of the Year		In July 1985, the society awarded its Republican of the Year award to then-Vice President George H. W. Bush.
1995	Welfare reform	President Bill Clinton signs the "Welfare to Work" reform legislation.	In 1995, the Society advocated for changes to the welfare reform bill. The Society called its idea "Work, Not Wait Incentive." The plan would have allowed welfare recipients to keep more of the money they earned from work before losing some of their welfare benefits. Several Members of Congress who served on Ripon's Advisory Board advocated for the "Work, Not Wait Incentive". Those members included Representatives Bill Clinger, Amo Houghton, Nancy Johnson, Susan Molinari, Tillie Fowler, Connie Morella, and Senators John Chafee, Nancy Kassebaum and Arlen Specter. In 2010, the Richard Nixon Foundation published a post on its website that said that "many of the ideas involved in welfare reform came out of the work of economist Milton Friedman, as well as discussions within the Ripon Society and groups affiliated with it, especially Yale Law School's Trumbull Society."
2006–2014	Immigration reform	An original "green card" issued by the U.S. government in 1946 The patch of a United States Border Patrol (USBP) uniform, worn on the right sleeve President George W. Bush addressed the nation on immigration reform on May 15, 2006.	In 2006, Tamar Jacoby (a senior fellow at the Manhattan Institute) wrote an editorial in the Ripon Society's magazine, The Ripon Forum, about the immigration issue. Jacoby argued that the American public wanted Congress and the President to finally solve the problem of illegal immigration and end it. Jacoby saw three options. First, the "tough" option, would increase border enforcement. Jacoby argued that this option would not work because tough-talking rhetoric and increases in border patrol budgets had not changed the number of illegal immigrants coming into the United States per year. The second option was to do nothing. (Jacoby argued against this option, too). The third option was to reform the systems related to immigration and naturalization, which President George W. Bush had pushed for. The immigration issue was large enough to come into play as a major topic at a Ripon Society event in Dublin, Ireland in 2013. The Franklin Center for Global Policy Exchange and Ripon hosted a policy conference in September 2013. Irish politicians and business people, plus 11 Members of Congress, participated. The panel discussed a problem known as "brain drain" that was affecting both Ireland and the United States: high-skilled workers were moving to other countries. Panel members pushed for the inclusion of a solution to this problem in any immigration reform package passed by Congress. The Ripon Society throughout 2014 hosted a series of public forums about the issue of immigration reform. Former Republican presidential nominee John McCain headlined a forum in April. McCain encouraged Congress to pass an immigration reform bill; he said that doing so would improve the economy, make the country safer and make the Republican Party perform stronger with Hispanic voters. "I've been to Iraq and Afghanistan many times, and I can assure you that we have the technology to secure our border," McCain said. McCain warned the audience that the Republican Party will not be able to win another presidential race unless the party supported immigration reform. In March, the president of the Pew Research Center, Michael Dimock, warned the Republican Party during an address to the Ripon Society to stop advocating small government conservative policies ("Try to take as much of the anti-government rhetoric out," he told the room). Dimock explained the demographic shift that would displace non-white people as the majority of the American population. In August, House Majority Leader Kevin McCarthy along with two California House members, Congressman Jeff Denham and Congressman David Valadao, spoke at a Ripon forum. The three emphasized border security as an important issue within immigration reform.

== Ripon Society and Federal Election Commission ==
In 2004, the Ripon Society requested a legal advisory opinion from the Federal Election Commission (FEC). Ripon wanted to pay for a TV campaign commercial in favor of the re-election of Congresswoman Sue Kelly (R-NY). Ripon's argument in favor of being allowed to run the commercial was that the commercial would promote homeland security policies that the Ripon Society, and Congresswoman Kelly, supported.

The requested advisory opinion amounted to a request for an interpretation of the Federal Election Campaign Act of 1971 as it applied to the specific details of the proposed campaign advertisement.

The FEC responded by saying that the law prohibited Ripon from paying for the ad if it was televised within Congresswoman Kelly's congressional district. However, the FEC said that Ripon could pay for the ad if it were televised outside of her district and only if the Ripon Society did not coordinate with Republican Party officials.

In FEC Advisory Opinion 2004-33, the FEC said the Ripon Society could not legally pay for a political TV commercial for a congressional candidate if it was aired in the candidate's district immediately before an election (30 days before a primary election or 60 days before a general election). At that time (2004), the law prohibited corporate funds from paying for "electioneering communication", an umbrella term that includes campaign TV commercials.

== Republican of the Year Award ==
In addition to George H. W. Bush, other Republican of the Year recipients have included former Senator Bob Dole and former Senator Howard Baker

== Programs ==
=== Lecture series ===
The Ripon Society hosts a series of lectures known as their "Policy & Politics Dialogue Series", which in 2011 has consisted of over 40 idea-based forums. Speakers have included: Speaker of the House John Boehner, Representatives Kevin Brady and Greg Walden, Senators Rob Portman and John McCain, former Secretary of Defense Donald Rumsfeld, and Republican National Committee Chairman Reince Priebus. At a Ripon event in January 2013, shortly after President Obama's second inaugural address, Boehner told the audience that President Obama was trying to "annihilate the Republican Party."

=== Breakfast series ===
The Ripon Society hosts breakfast forums that feature members of Congress. For example, the breakfast forums have hosted the Republican Women's Policy Committee, National Republican Senatorial Committee, and House Ways and Means Committee members.

=== Rough Rider awards ===
Between 1999 and 2004, the Society gave what was known as the Rough Rider Awards to recognize public officeholders who have "'stood in the arena, and pushed for innovative policy solutions on a range of issues." Notable recipients included former Wisconsin Governor and Secretary of Health and Human Services Tommy Thompson, future House Speaker John Boehner, and White House Chief of Staff Andrew H. Card.

== Bipartisan action ==
This section summarizes some of the bipartisan legislation and actions led by Members of Congress who sit on Ripon's congressional advisory board.

== Congressional Advisory Board ==
U.S. Senate	Shelley Moore Capito, Senate Co-Chair (West Virginia); Cory Gardner, Senate Co-Chair (Colorado); Roy Blunt (Missouri); Richard Burr (North Carolina); Susan M. Collins (Maine); Steve Daines (Montana); Joni Ernst (Iowa); Deb Fischer (Nebraska); Orrin G. Hatch (Utah); John Hoeven (North Dakota); Jerry Moran (Kansas); Pat Roberts (Kansas); Mike Rounds (South Dakota); Thom Tillis (North Carolina); Roger Wicker (Mississippi); Todd Young (Indiana)		
U.S. House	Midwest	IL	Rodney Davis; Randy Hultgren; Adam Kinzinger; Darin LaHood; Peter Roskam; John Shimkus
U.S. House	Midwest	IN	Susan Brooks, House Chair; Larry Bucshon, M.D.; Jackie Walorski
U.S. House	Midwest	KS	Lynn Jenkins
U.S. House	Midwest	MI	Mike Bishop; Bill Huizenga; John Moolenaar; Fred Upton
U.S. House	Midwest	MN	Erik Paulsen, Vice Chair-Midwest; Tom Emmer
U.S. House	Midwest	MO	Sam Graves; Billy Long
U.S. House	Midwest	NE	Don Bacon
U.S. House	Midwest	OH	David Joyce; Jim Renacci; Steve Stivers; Mike Turner; Brad Wenstrup
U.S. House	Midwest	OK	Tom Cole; Frank Lucas
U.S. House	Midwest	SD	Kristi Noem
U.S. House	Midwest	WI	Sean Duffy
U.S. House	Midwest	WV	Evan Jenkins
U.S. House	West	CA	Ken Calvert; Jeff Denham; Darrell Issa; Kevin McCarthy; Mimi Walters
U.S. House	West	NV	Mark Amodei
U.S. House	West	OR	Greg Walden, Vice Chair-West
U.S. House	West	WA	Cathy McMorris Rodgers
U.S. House	South	AL	Martha Roby, Vice Chair-South
U.S. House	South	AR	French Hill; Steve Womack
U.S. House	South	FL	Vern Buchanan; Carlos Curbelo; Tom Rooney
U.S. House	South	GA	Doug Collins
U.S. House	South	KY	Andy Barr
U.S. House	South	LA	Steve Scalise
U.S. House	South	SC	Tom Rice
U.S. House	South	TN	Diane Black; Marsha Blackburn
U.S. House	South	TX	Michael C. Burgess, M.D.; Bill Flores; Kay Granger; Michael McCaul; John Ratcliffe; Lamar Smith; Mac Thornberry
U.S. House	South	VA	Barbara Comstock
U.S. House	East	ME	Bruce Poliquin
U.S. House	East	NJ	Rodney Frelinghuysen; Leonard Lance; Tom MacArthur
U.S. House	East	NY	Dan Donovan; John Katko; Tom Reed
U.S. House	East	PA	Bill Shuster, Vice Chair-Northeast; Ryan Costello; Charlie Dent; Mike Kelly; Tom Marino; Glenn Thompson

The advisory board also includes the following retired Members of Congress:

- Bill Archer (TX)
- Henry Bonilla (TX)
- Michael Castle (DE)
- Geoff Davis (KY)
- Mike Ferguson (NJ)
- David Hobson (OH)
- Nancy Johnson (CT)
- Sue Kelly (NY)
- Scott Klug (WI)
- Bob Livingston (LA)
- Jim McCrery (LA)
- Robert H. Michel (IL)
- Susan Molinari (NY)
- Don Nickles (OK)
- Bill Paxon (NY)
- Deborah Pryce (OH)
- Tom Reynolds (NY)
- Tom Ridge (PA)
- Gordon Smith (OR)
- Don Sundquist (TN)
- Tom Tauke (IA)
- Robert Walker (PA)

Source: Ripon Society website.

== Legal information ==
The Ripon Society is a 501(c)(4) incorporated non-profit social welfare organization. The current Ripon Society logo is trademarked. The trademark describes the logo: "The mark consists in part of a stylized depiction of an elephant." Ripon filed the trademark application on May 9, 2002, with the U.S. Patent and Trademark Office.

== Historical bibliography ==
=== 1960–1969 ===
- Beal, Christopher W.; d'. Amato, Anthony A. (1968). The Realities of Vietnam: A Ripon Society Appraisal. Public Affairs Press.
- Gillette, Howard F. "Ripon Society records, 1963-1978". Collection Number 2824. Division of Rare and Manuscript Collections (New York, NY: Cornell University Library). "Includes correspondence, research projects, civil rights material, reports, fund raising material, programs, minutes of meetings, financial records, memoranda, press releases, newsletters, publications, correspondence and other material related to various Republican organizations, mailings to potential contributors and subscribers, membership records, research materials and papers, clippings, and other records of the Ripon Society. Also records of the Ripon Society collected by Howard F. Gillette, Jr."
- Huebner, Lee W.; Petri, Thomas E. (1968). The Ripon papers, 1963-1968. National Press. Digitized 16 August 2011
- Samuelson, Robert J. (February 1965). "Ripon Society Owes Its Success To the Enemy, Sen. Goldwater". The Harvard Crimson.
- The Ripon Society. Firing Line with William F. Buckley Jr. (TV). New York, NY: PBS. 24 February 1969. "During the battles for the Republican Party in the 1960s, the Ripon Society was founded in Massachusetts to further liberal ("moderate" in the Society's own terminology) tendencies in the party – the Rockefeller, Scranton, Romney wing, as opposed to the Goldwater, Reagan, and even Nixon wing. Today's conversation changes none of the participants' minds, but it clearly lays out the two wings' current positions. WFB: "The Ripon Society certainly seems to me to have affected most people as an organization that is industriously engaged in trying to persuade the Republican Party to be like the Democratic Party." TEP: "No, it's engaged in persuading the Republican Party to do those things that will enable it to compete with the Democratic Party in states where the Democratic Party is strong. That's a bit different. We try to take Republican ideas and formulate them so that they can embrace the necessary role of government in the last few decades of this century.""

=== 1970–1979 ===
- Auspitz, Josiah Lee (1 March 1970.) "A Reply from the Ripon Society". March 1970. Commentary Magazine.
- Brown Jr., Clifford W (1974). Ripon Society Jaws of Victory: The Game-Plan Politics of 1972, Ede Crisis of the Republican Party, and the Future of the Constitution.
- Delegates discrimination and the Constitution: a Ripon Society statement on the malapportionment of delegates to Republican National Conventions. Indiana University and The Ripon Society. 1972. Digitized 13 May 2010.
- The Republican State Central Committee of Arizona v. The Ripon Society Inc, 409 U.S. 1222 (U.S. Supreme Court 1972).
- The Ripon Society, Inc. v. National Republican Party, 525 F.2d. 567 (D.C. Court of Appeals 1976).

=== 1980–1989 ===
- Hunter, Marjorie; Weaver Jr., Warren (30 July 1985). "Republican of the Year". Briefing. The New York Times. "When Vice President Bush sought the Republican nomination for President in 1980, he was generally billed as a moderate, at least more of a moderate than Ronald Reagan. But as President Reagan's Vice President, Mr. Bush has kept a relatively conservative profile. And so it is of more than passing interest to note that he will receive the Republican of the Year award tonight from the Ripon Society, a research organization that fosters moderate Republicanism, commitment to arms control, expansion of civil rights, fiscal responsibility and renewal of environmental resources. The award places the Vice President on a par, at least within the Ripon ranks, with two other men who might seek the Republican Presidential nomination in 1988. The two, Bob Dole and Howard H. Baker Jr., were past recipients of the Republican of the Year award."
- King; Wayne; Weaver Jr., Warren (11 August 1986). "Loyalty and Then Some". Washington Talk: Briefing. The New York Times. "The Ripon Society has prided itself over the years on being younger, more academic-oriented and more progressive in philosophy than the rest of the Republican Party, but it has nevertheless remained resolutely inside that party. Just now, with the Democrats trying to regain in November the Senate majority they lost six years ago, the society is proclaiming and demonstrating its supervening loyalty to the G.O.P."
- Smith, Terence (8 July 1981). "U.S. Frames Policy on Halting Spread of Nuclear Arms". World. The New York Times. "The Reagan policy stops short of suggestions that have been made since the June 7 Israeli attack on an Iraqi nuclear reactor. For instance, the Ripon Society, an organization of moderate and liberal Republicans, recently called on the Administration to declare that any shipment of weapons-grade nuclear material or facilities that could be used to produce weapons would be construed as an act of international terrorism, subject to American economic sanctions. The Reagan guidelines contain no such provision."

=== 1990–1999 ===
- White, John Kenneth; Mileur, Jerome M. (1992). Challenges to Party Government. SIU Press. pp. 66–67. ISBN 9780809318346. "In another 1975 decision, Ripon Society v. National Republican Party, in which the liberal Ripon Society challenged the Republican Party's delegate-apportionment formula as favoring conservative states, the Court upheld the national party's right to define its own delegate apportionment formula. It should be emphasized that while this was a victory for national prerogatives, the Ripon Society wanted the apportionment formula to reflect the party's geographical strength more accurately, an objective also endorsed by the committee."

=== 2000–2009 ===
- DeMuth, Christopher B. (14 January 2008). "Christopher B. DeMuth Interview Transcription" (PDF). The Richard Nixon Presidential Library (Interview). Interviewed by Timothy Naftali. Yorba Linda, California.
- "The Ripon Society's Congressional Report: Public Policies for Debate 2005". Washington, D.C.: The Ripon Society. 2005.
- Wallison, Peter (18 November 2009). "Peter Wallison Interview Transcription". Gerald R. Ford Oral History Project (Interview). Interviewed by Richard Norton Smith. Rapids City, Michigan: Gerald Ford Foundation.

=== 2010– ===
- Cahn, Emily (2 October 2012). "Ripon Society Dives Into 'Let Teddy Win' Campaign". Heard on the Hill. Roll Call. Washington, D.C.: CQ-Roll Call, Inc.
- Coburn, George M.; Cramer, William C.; Pennoyer, Robert M. (2011). The Ripon Society, Inc., Et Al., Petitioners, V. National Republican Party Et Al. U.S. Supreme Court Transcript of Record with Supporting Pleadings. Gale Ecco. ISBN 9781270653677.
- Ed Gillespie addresses The Ripon Society's 4th Annual Symposium on Leadership (Video). The Ripon Society. 12 March 2014. Archived from the original on 2021-12-21.
- Howard L. Reiter; Jeffrey M. Stonecash (2012). Counter Realignment: Political Change in the Northeastern United States. Cambridge University Press. p. 82. ISBN 9781139493130.
- Kabaservice, Geoffrey (2012). Rule and Ruin: The Downfall of Moderation and the Destruction of the Republican Party, From Eisenhower to the Tea Party. Oxford University Press. p. 261. ISBN 9780199921133.
- Martin, Aaron (13 March 2014). "Ripon Society holds 2014 Legislative and Communications Directors Symposium". The Ripon Advance. Washington, D.C.: The Ripon Society.
- Noah, Timothy (6 January 2012). "The Strange Death of the Republican Moderate". Sunday Book Review. The New York Times.
- Viteritti, Joseph P. (2014). Summer in the City: John Lindsay, New York, and the American Dream. JHU Press. ISBN 9781421412627. "Most of Lindsay's campaign white papers were compiled by progressive Republican activists from organizations such as the Ripon Society, Republican Advance, and Republicans for Progress ... Numbers derived from the 1964 endorsements of the Committee to Support Moderate Republicans and the Ripon Society, plus National Review's listing of House Republicans who permitted Democratic victories on "crucial Administration measures of an anti-conservative nature."
- Zickar, Lou (28 May 2010). "Centrists' return good news for GOP". Politico.
