= Shakespeare theater =

The Shakespeare Theater was conceived by Patricio Orozco and for the first time constructed in February 2013, for the III Shakespeare Festival in Buenos Aires opening.

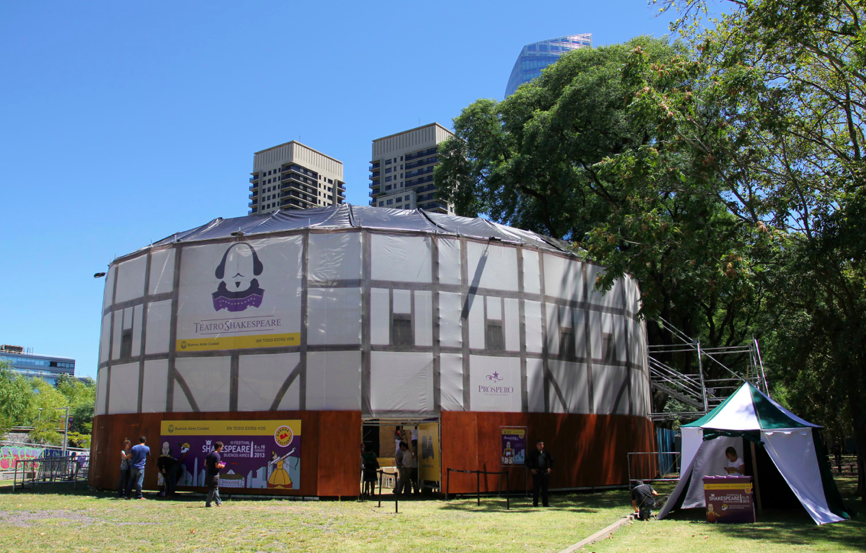
Shakespeare theater

The Shakespeare Theater is a mobile construction that evokes an Elizabethan theatre and has as its main objective to bring the spectator to a new theater experience. The Theater invites spectators to take part on the plays the same way they did in London in the 1600, at the theater where Shakespeare exposed his texts.

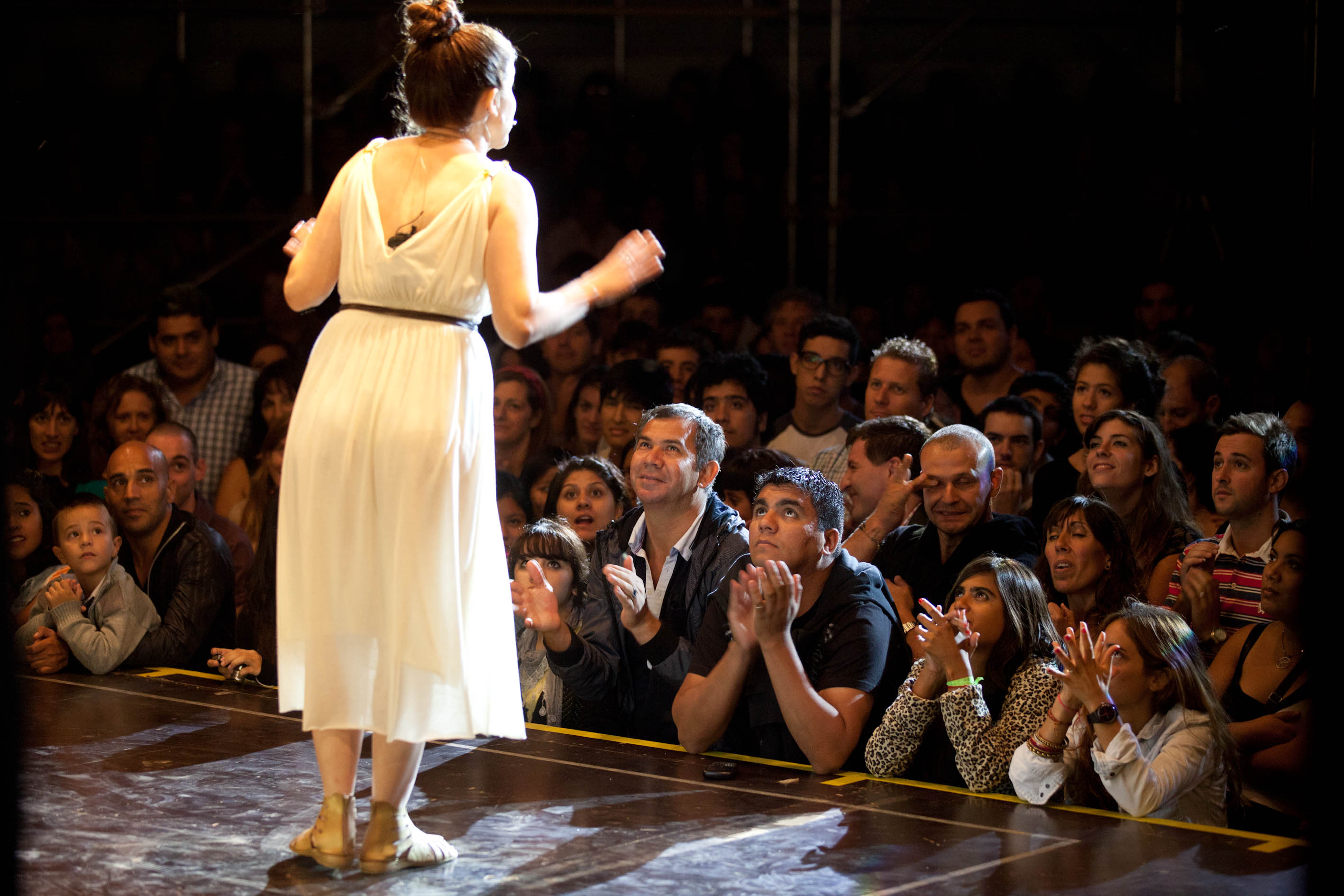
The audience

The encircling structure of the theater, plus the possibility of the audience at the field of being standing and being able to move to the place they find most attractive, make of this the experience of assisting to a representation, an unforgettable one. In this kind of spaces, the well known quote attributed to the English author “All the world’s a stage”, makes a lot of sense. Shakespeare thought his plays to be performed in these theaters, and that is why his texts are redefined when worked in this type of theatrical space.

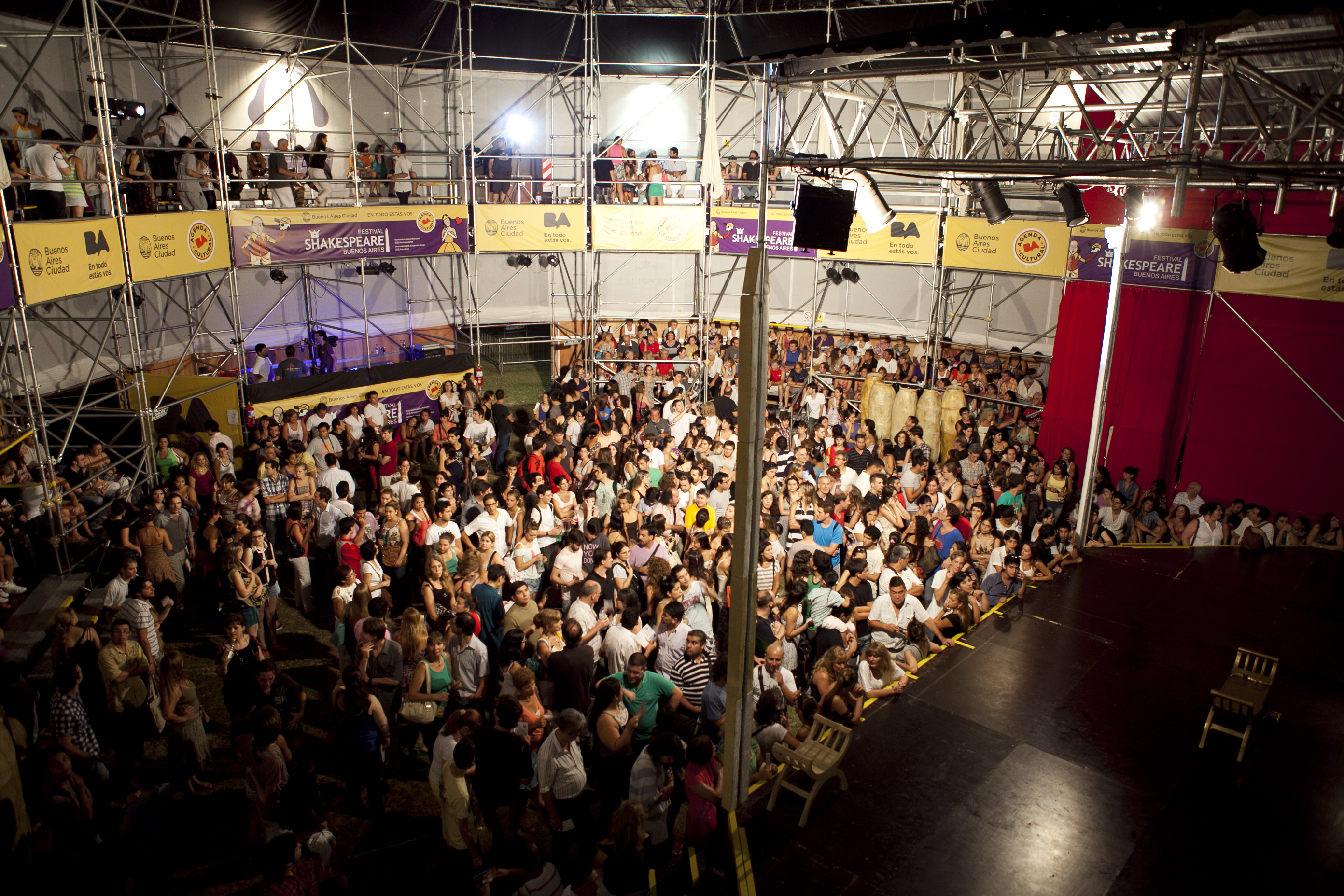
Inside the Shakespeare theater

== Location ==
The Shakespeare Theater promotes union, and meeting the most varied audience to celebrate the holiday of the theater, a celebration that has been happening since even more than 400 years in these theaters.

Its first location was at Mujeres Argentinas Park, in Costanera Sur. In that beautiful space, several performances for adults and children were programmed and also some workshops were given, all related to William Shakespeare´s works.

At the moment the theater is located in Villa Luro´s neighborhood in the city of Buenos Aires.
