= Susan D. Phillips =

Canadian political scientist

Susan D. Phillips is a Canadian political scientist and Distinguished Research Professor Emerita at Carleton University's School of Public Policy and Administration in Ottawa, Canada. Her research focuses on public policy and regulation concerning nonprofit organizations and philanthropy, public management, civil society, charitable-sector financing, and community-based philanthropy. In 2025, she was appointed a Member of the Order of Canada.

== Biography ==
Phillips grew up in Craigmyle, Alberta, a rural community in southeastern Alberta. She spent her high school years in Nelson, British Columbia.

She received a B.A. with honours in geography from the University of Victoria in 1976, followed by an M.A. in geography from the University of Waterloo in 1979. She earned an M.A. in political science from Carleton University in 1981 and a Ph.D. in political science from Carleton in 1990.

Phillips joined Carleton University's School of Public Administration in 1988 and became a full professor, serving as its director from 2005 to 2014. She founded Carleton's Master of Philanthropy and Nonprofit Leadership (MPNL) program in 2013.

In 2024, she served as Interim Chief Advancement Officer at Carleton University. Since becoming Professor Emerita in 2025, she has directed the Women in Philanthropy Initiative and served as Interim Director of the Charity Insights Canada Project at Carleton University.

== Research ==
Phillips' research examines the relationship between government and civil society, with focus on public policy and regulation affecting nonprofit organizations and philanthropy. Phillips's research focuses on philanthropy, nonprofit governance and financing, cross-sector collaboration, community foundations, and public management. Her work examines the relationship between governments and voluntary organizations and the influence of policy and regulatory frameworks on the nonprofit sector.

From 2016 to 2022, Phillips served as editor-in-chief of Nonprofit and Voluntary Sector Quarterly.

She received the Distinguished Service Award from the Canadian Association for Research in Nonprofits and Social Economy (ANSER-ARES).
