= New York Historical =

Museum and library in New York City

Coordinates: 40°46′45″N 73°58′27″W

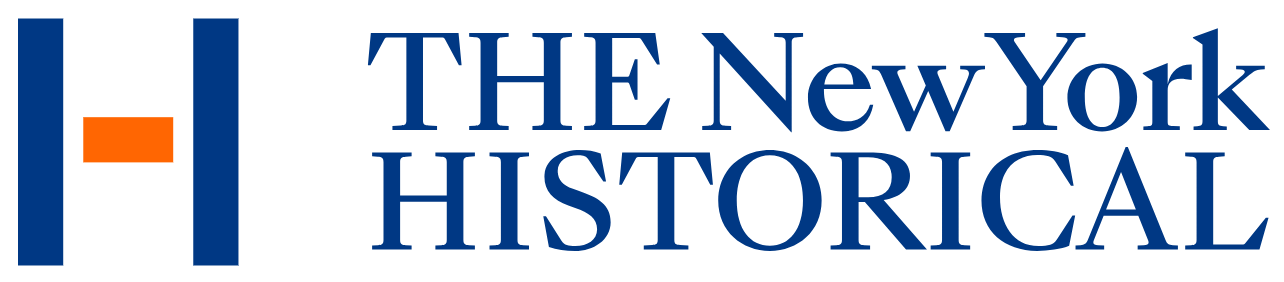

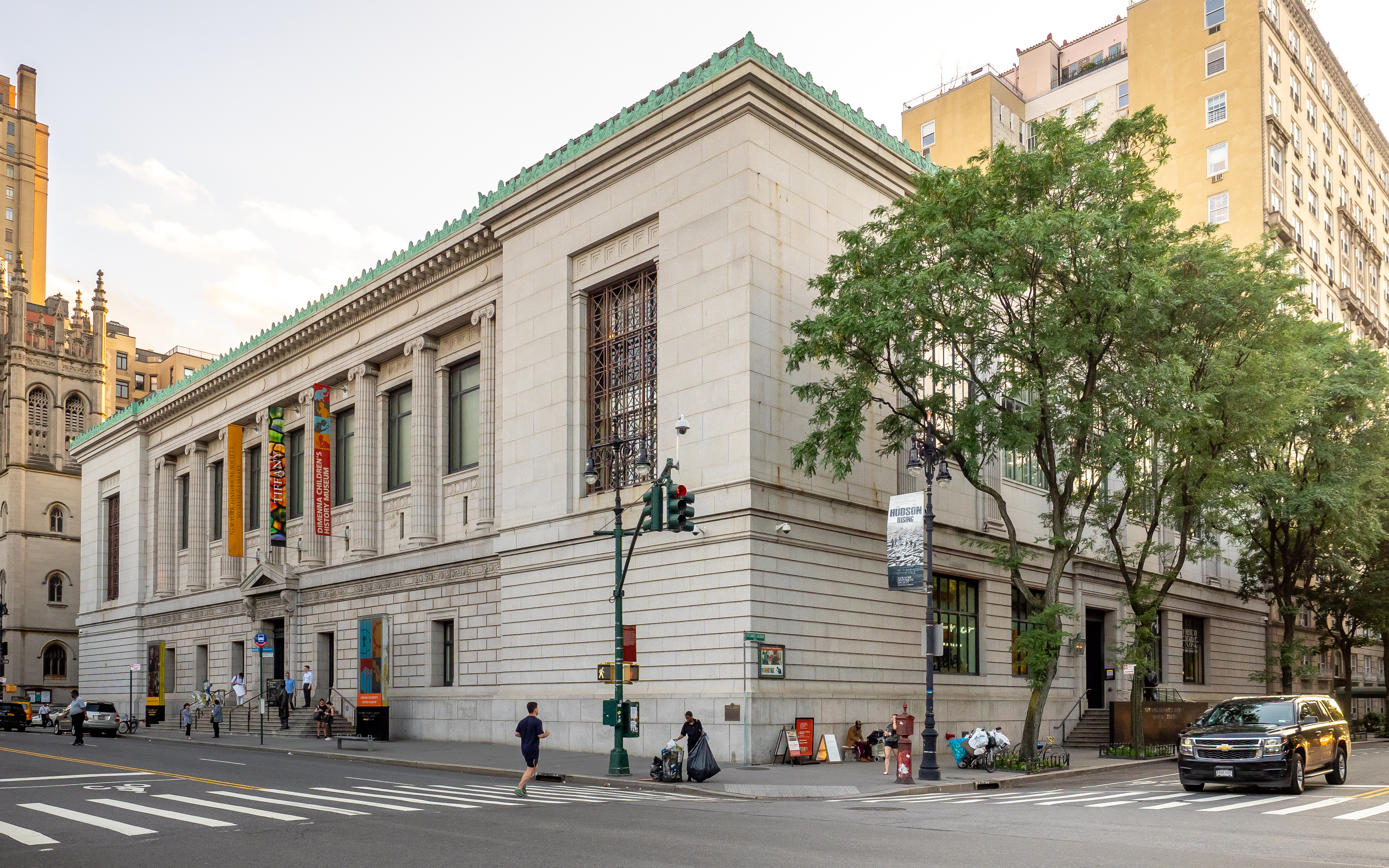
- Established: 1804
- Location: New York City, US
- Type: American history museum and library
- President: Louise Mirrer
- Architects: York and Sawyer and Walker & Gillette
- Website: www.nyhistory.org

The New York Historical (known as the New-York Historical Society until 2024) is an American history museum and library on the Upper West Side of Manhattan in New York City. The society was founded in 1804 as New York's first museum. It presents exhibitions, public programs, and research that explore the history of New York and the nation. The New York Historical Museum & Library has been at its present location since 1908. The granite building was designed by York & Sawyer in a classic Roman Eclectic style. The building, along Central Park West between 76th and 77th Streets, is a New York City designated landmark. A renovation, completed in November 2011, made the building more accessible to the public, provided space for an interactive children's museum, and facilitated access to its collections.

Louise Mirrer has been the president of the New York Historical since 2004. Beginning in 2005, the museum presented a two-year exhibit on Slavery in New York, its largest theme exhibition in 200 years on a topic which it had never addressed before. It included an art exhibit by artists invited to use museum collections in their works. The Society generally focuses on the developing city center in Manhattan. Another historical society, the Long Island Historical Society (later Brooklyn Historical Society) was founded in Brooklyn in 1863.

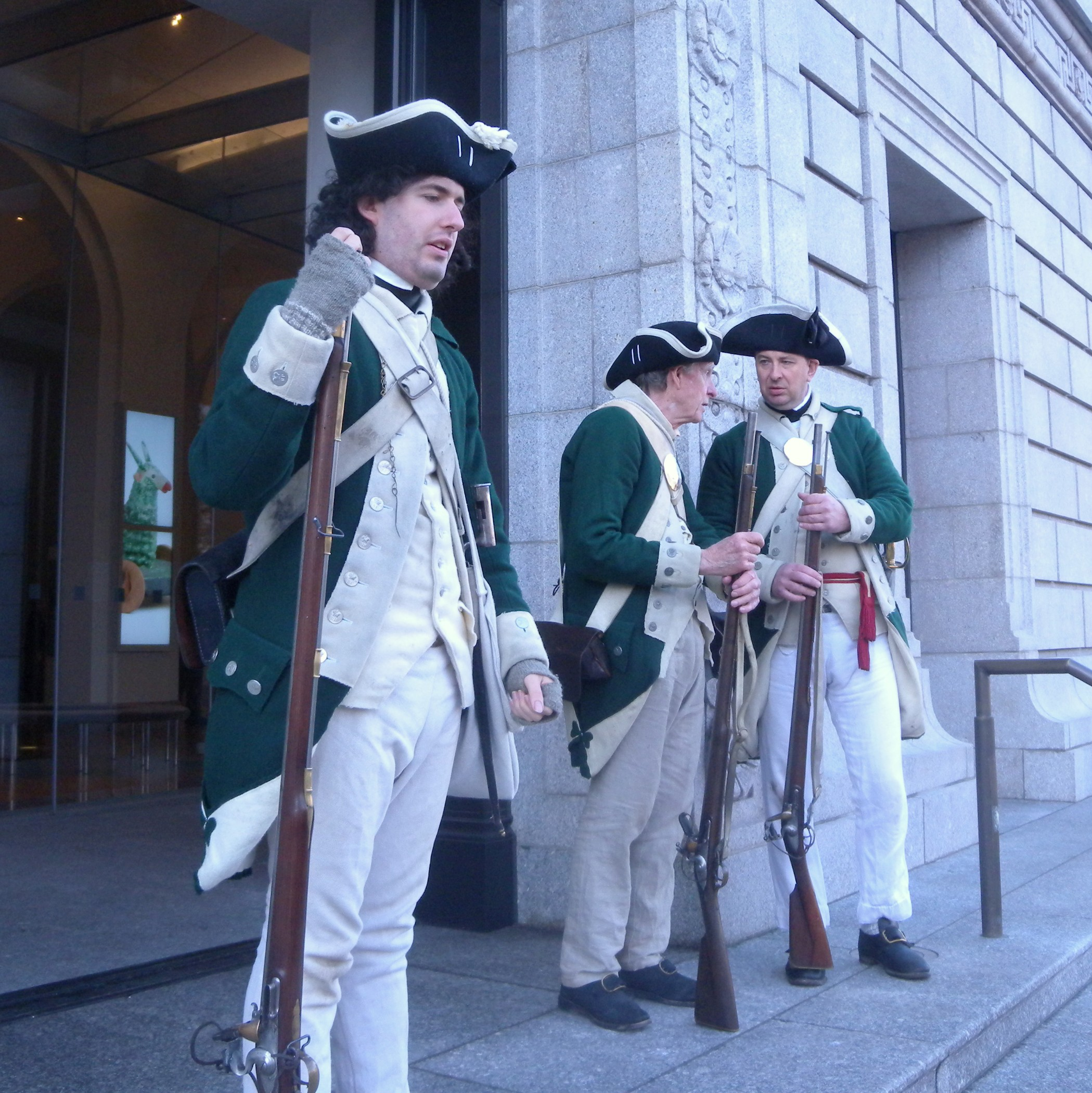
Re-enactment of loyalist colonial troops guarding the Society building from George Washington's Rebels

The New York Historical holds an extensive collection of historical artifacts, works of American art, and other materials documenting the history of New York and the United States. It presents well-researched exhibitions on a variety of topics and periods in American history, such as George Washington, Alexander Hamilton, Slavery in New York, The Hudson River School, Abraham Lincoln, Ulysses S. Grant, Tiffany designer Clara Driscoll, and the history of the Constitution. The Society also offers an extensive range of curriculum-based school programs and teacher resources, and provides academic fellowships and organizes public programs for adults to foster lifelong learning and a deep appreciation of history.

== Collections ==
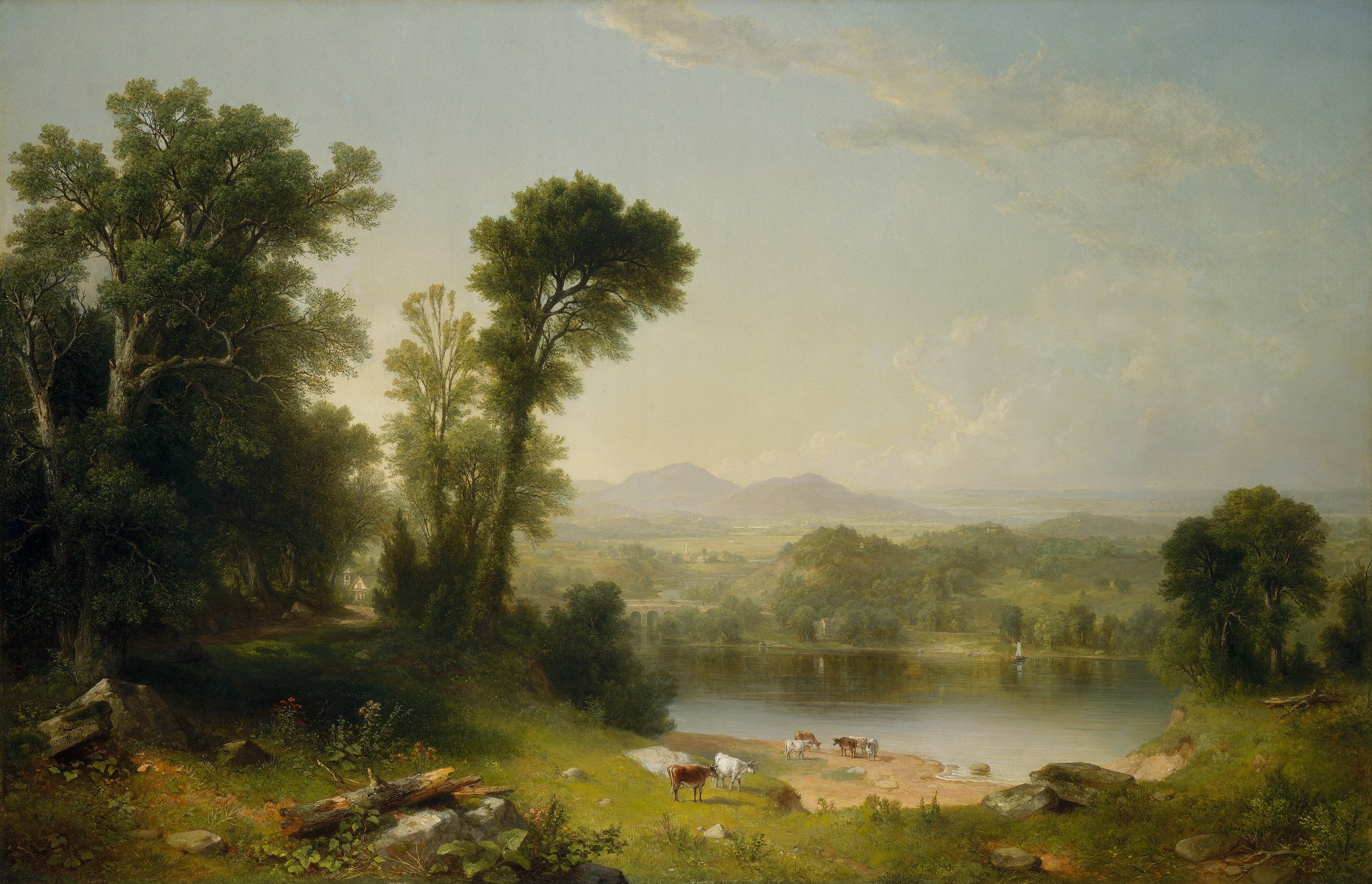
Asher B. Durand, Pastoral Landscape, 1861

The New York Historical's museum is the oldest in New York City and predates the founding of the Metropolitan Museum of Art by nearly 70 years. Its art holdings comprise more than 1.6 million works. Among them are a world-class collection of Hudson River School paintings, including major works by Thomas Cole and Frederic Edwin Church; iconic genre and history paintings, including works by William Sidney Mount and Eastman Johnson; a vast range of American portraits, including paintings by Rembrandt Peale and Gilbert Stuart; all 435 of John James Audubon's extant preparatory watercolors for The Birds of America; and an encyclopedic collection of more than 800 works documenting the full catalog of representational sculpture in America from the colonial period to the present day.

The Historical Society holds an important collection of paintings and drawings by marine artist James Bard. The museum holds much of sculptor Elie Nadelman's legendary American folk art collection, including furniture and household accessories such as lamps, candlesticks, textiles, glass, and ceramic objects, as well as paintings, toys, weather vanes, sculptural woodcarvings, and chalkware. The Historical Society's holdings in artifacts and decorative arts include George Washington's camp bed from Valley Forge, the desk at which Clement Clarke Moore wrote "A Visit from Saint Nicholas", one of the world's largest collections of Tiffany lamps and glasswork, and a collection of more than 550 late 19th-century American board games. The New York Historical also owns several thousand photographs and other images by photographer Bill Cunningham.

Its research library contains more than three million books, pamphlets, maps, atlases, newspapers, broadsides, music sheets, manuscripts, prints, photographs, and architectural drawings. Among its collections are far-ranging materials relating to the founding and early history of the nation including the first documentary evidence of the phrase "United States of America"; one of the best collections of 18th-century newspapers in the United States; an outstanding collection of materials documenting slavery and Reconstruction; an exceptional collection of Civil War material, including Ulysses S. Grant's terms of surrender for Robert E. Lee; collections relating to trials in the United States prior to 1860; American fiction, poetry, and belles-lettres prior to 1850; a broad range of materials relating to the history of the circus; and American travel accounts from the colonial era to the present day.

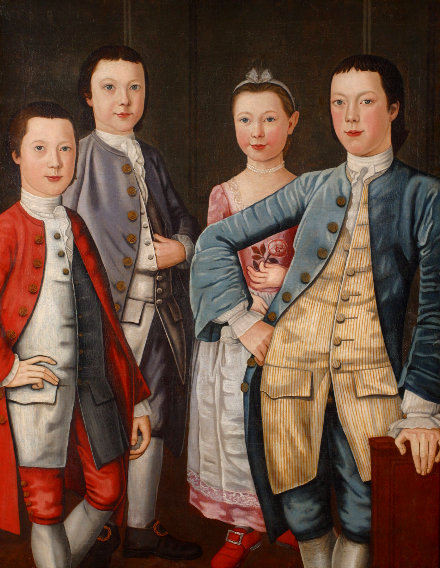
The Rapalje Children, John Durand, 1768. Collection of the New York Historical.

The society operates a website showing many images from its collection. In 2015, it announced the digitization and posting of over a thousand negatives by photographer Robert L. Bracklow from the late 19th and early 20th centuries.

== Early history ==
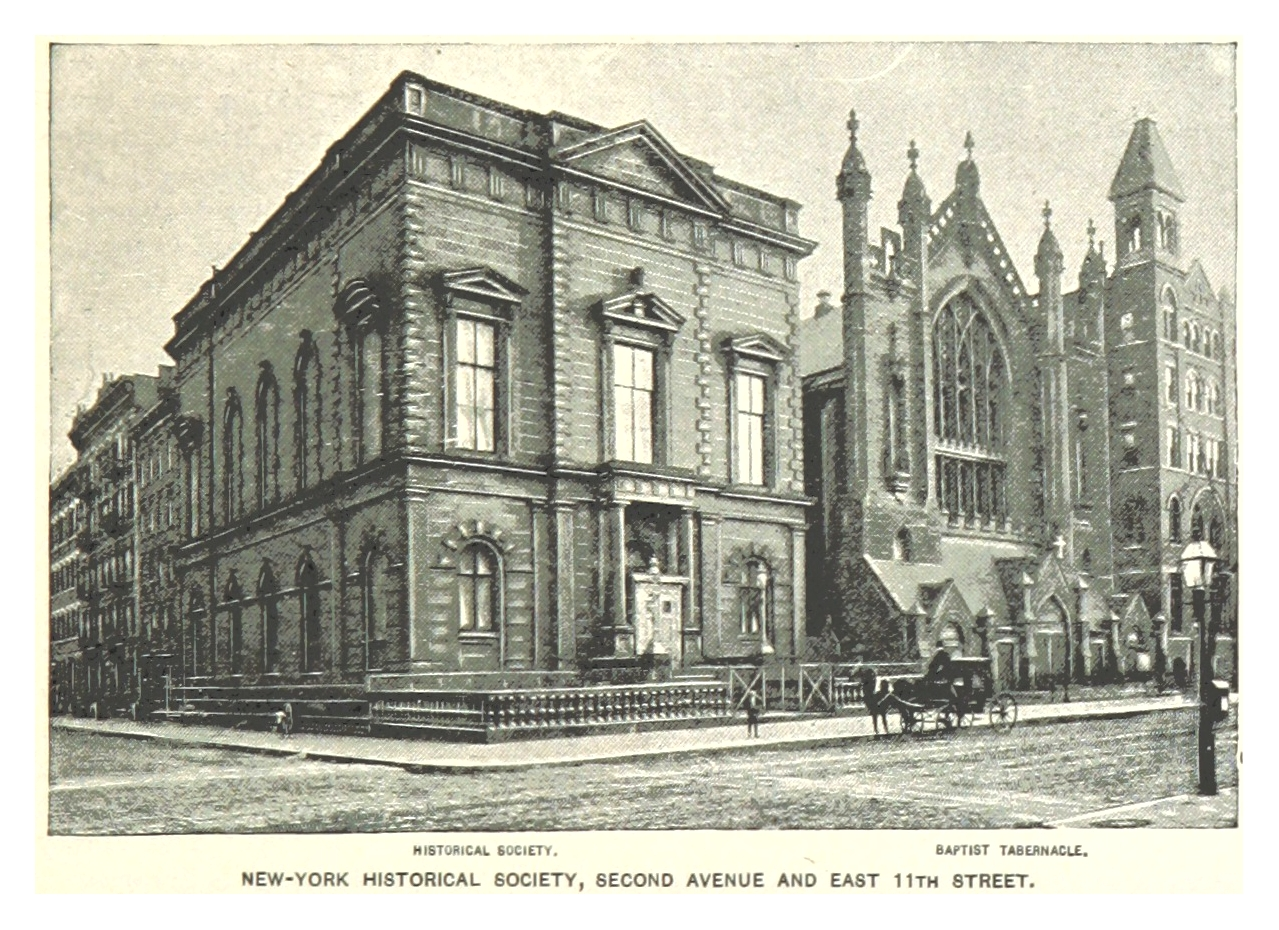
The Historical Society on 11th Street in the late 19th century

The Historical Society was founded on November 20, 1804, largely through the efforts of John Pintard. He was for some years secretary of the American Academy of Fine Arts, as well as the founder of New York's first savings bank. He was also among the first to agitate for a free school system. The first meeting comprised 11 of the city's most prominent citizens, including Mayor DeWitt Clinton. At the meeting, a committee was selected to draw up a constitution, and by December 10, the Historical Society was officially organized.

According to the Historical Society's first catalogue, printed in 1813, the museum then held 4,265 books, as well as 234 volumes of United States documents, 119 almanacs, 130 titles of newspapers, 134 maps, and 30 miscellaneous views. It had already collected the start of a manuscript collection, several oil portraits and 38 engraved portraits.

The Historical Society suffered under heavy debt during its early decades. In 1809, it organized a celebration of the 200th anniversary of the arrival of Henry Hudson in New York Harbor. Inspired by the event, the Historical Society petitioned and later obtained an endowment from the New York State Legislature, to be financed by a lottery in 1814. The failure of the lottery resulted in a debt that forced the Society to mortgage some of its books, which were not redeemed until 1823.

The Historical Society and its collections moved frequently during the 19th century. In 1809, the Historical Society and its collections moved to the Government House on Bowling Green. Constructed as a residence for the President of the United States when New York was the temporary capital, the building had been unoccupied since the government's relocation to Philadelphia in 1790. In 1816, the Historical Society moved to the New York Institution, formerly the city almshouse on City Hall Park.

In 1857, it moved into the first building constructed specifically for its collections, at the then-fashionable intersection of Second Avenue and 11th Street, where it stayed for the next 50 years. The Historical Society later acquired a collection of Egyptian and Assyrian art, which was eventually transferred to the Brooklyn Museum of Art. In 1936 it acquired the collections of the Naval History Society (1912–1936).

== Current building ==
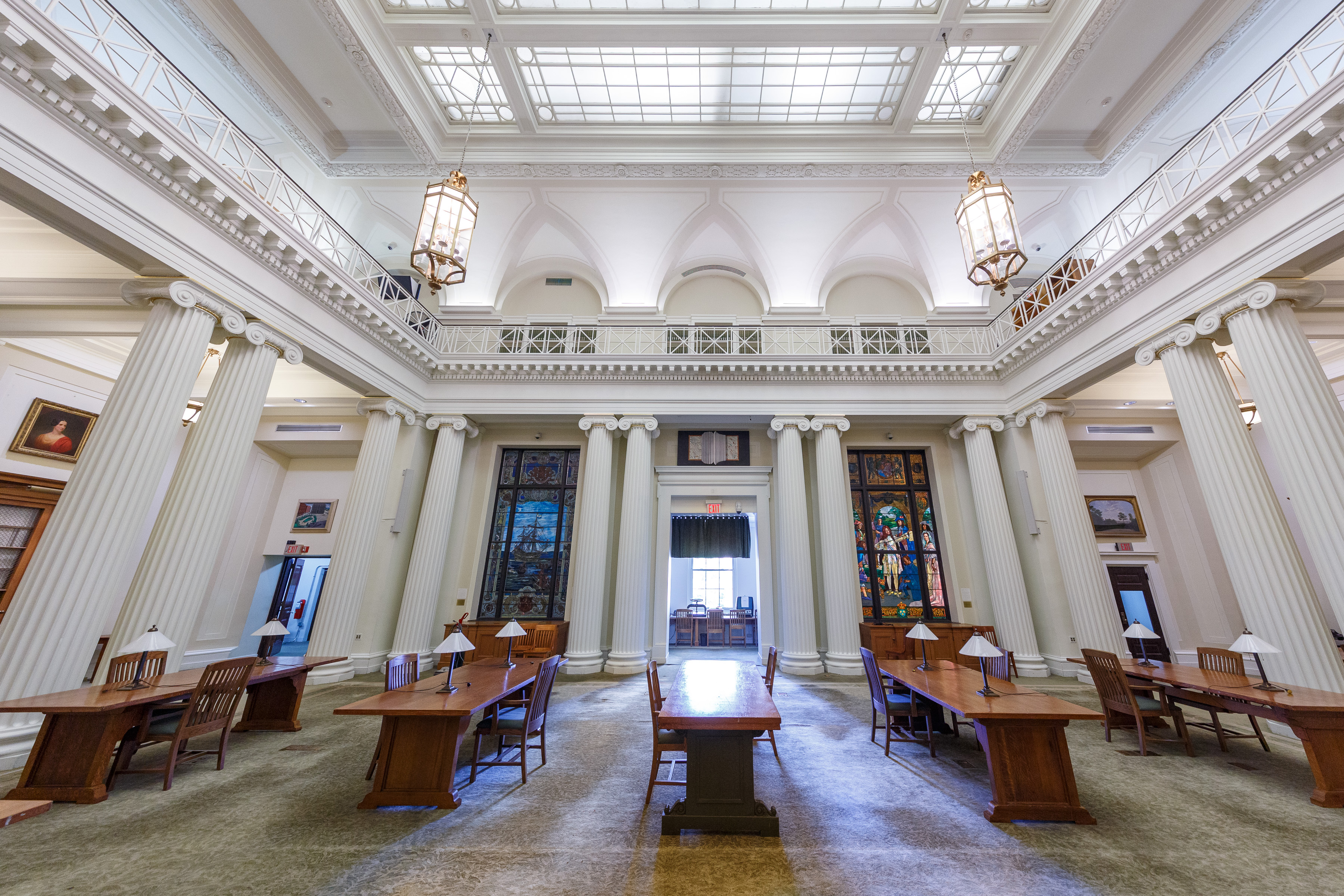
Patricia D. Klingenstein Library on the second floor

Construction for its eighth home began September 10, 1902. The central portion of the current building on Central Park West was completed on December 15, 1908, to designs by architects York and Sawyer, who were known for their bank designs. In 1938 that central block was extended and sympathetically completed by the construction of pavilions on either end, with Walker & Gillette as architects. That extension project stands among the last examples of Beaux-Arts architecture completed in the city and in the entire country. The building was designated a landmark by the New York City Landmarks Preservation Commission in 1966. The building is also part of the Central Park West–76th Street Historic District, designated by the LPC, and is a contributing property to the Central Park West Historic District, listed on the National Register of Historic Places.

Two notable stained glass windows are found in the library on the 2nd floor. The Arrival of Henry Hudson was designed by Mr. Calvert of the Gorham Manufacturing Company. The second is Revocation of the Edict of Nantes, known as the French Huguenot memorial window, in honor of religious refugees to New York. It is inscribed and signed by the artist, Mary Elizabeth Tillinghast. The window was underwritten by Margaret Olivia Slocum Sage, a philanthropist who was instrumental in commissioning other windows by Tillinghast.

== Decline and revival ==
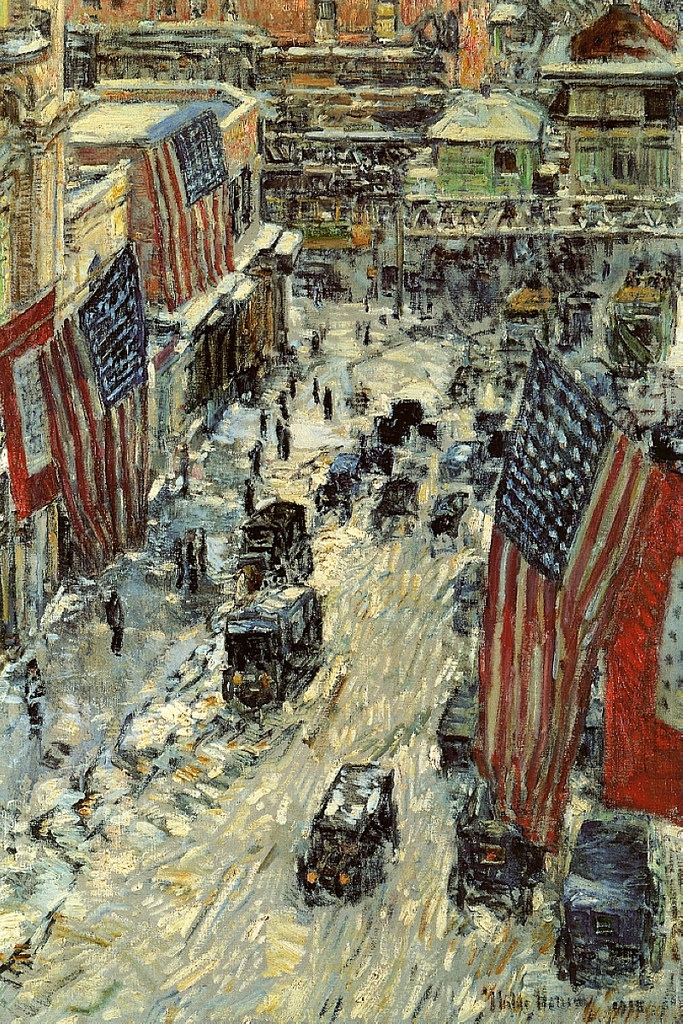
Frederick Childe Hassam, Flags on Fifty-Seventh Street, oil on canvas, 1918, in the New York Historical's collection

The Historical Society's collection continued to grow throughout the 20th century, but renewed financial woes in the 1970s and 1980s forced the Historical Society to limit access to its collections to professional researchers. In the 1980s, under the leadership of Herbert S. Winokur, Jr., a private equity financier and Enron board member, the Society was forced to use endowment invasion to pay their annual operating costs and cover their salaries, to the point where by 1988, they had only enough money in their endowment to pay for another 18 months of operating expenses.

Barbara Knowles Debs from Manhattanville College was named interim director of the Historical Society. In the same year hundreds of paintings, decorative art objects, and other artifacts, which were stored in a Manhattan warehouse, were found to be critically deteriorating. Many of the objects were on long-term loan to the museum.

In 1995, grants from the city and state restored public access under the direction of Betsy Gotbaum. Since the late 1990s, the New York Historical has invested significantly in facility and installation upgrades, and conducted fundraising. It has increased its operating budget by 160 percent to enhance and expand its public programs, while maintaining a balanced budget from 1998 to the present. Recent renovations to the Historical Society include new galleries and exhibition spaces, the Henry Luce III Center for the Study of American Culture, a state-of-the-art library reading room, and a new facility to house and provide access to the letters and manuscripts of the Gilder Lehrman Institute of American History. In 2005, the Historical Society was among 406 New York City arts and social service institutions to receive part of a $20 million grant from the Carnegie Corporation, which was made possible through a donation by New York City mayor Michael Bloomberg.

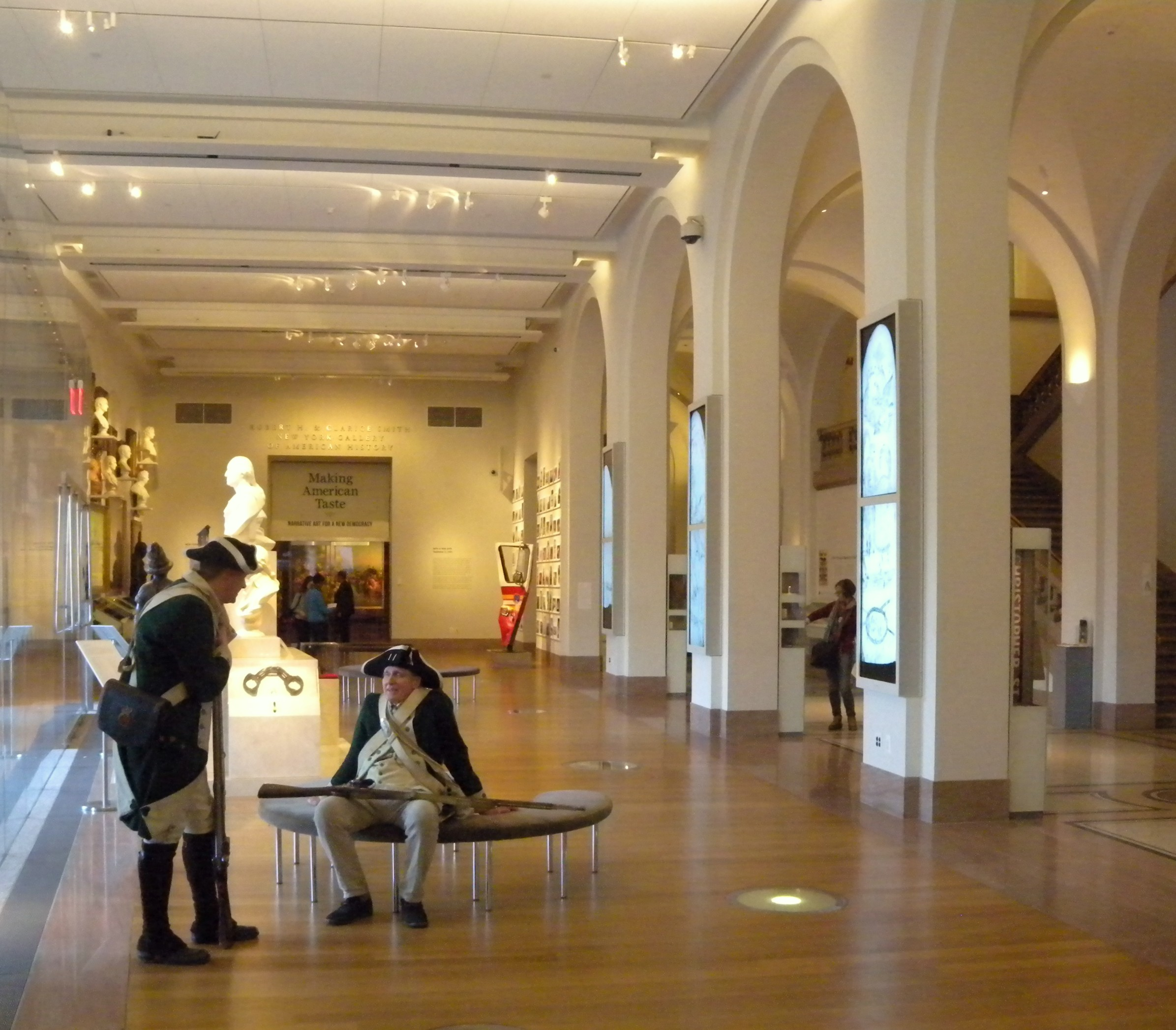
Costumed troops guard the front hall

The museum has mounted exhibits on national themes through history in New York. For instance, beginning in 2005 with Slavery and the Making of New York, 1600s–1827, it mounted the first exhibition ever in New York City on the major but little-known role of slavery in the city's economy and history. During the colonial years, 41% of households had slaves, and much of the city's economy through the Civil War was related to the South and slavery; half of its exports were related to cotton. Devoting the entire first floor to the exhibit, the museum mounted the largest theme exhibit in its 200-year history. It also addressed the strengths of African Americans who resisted slavery and created their own culture, both in New York and the nation.

A related part of the exhibit was commissioning 20 new works by invited artists, some of whom used objects from the museum's collections to create new works and installations on this theme. The second exhibition was New York Divided: Slavery and the Civil War, 1827–1865, (November 17, 2006 to September 3, 2007), which explored the economy before the war and strong business ties to the South, events related to the war such as the New York City Draft Riots, and other aspects. Southerners visited New York so frequently in the antebellum era that they had favorite hotels.

Under the direction of Louise Mirrer, a three-year, $65 million renovation of the landmark building on Central Park West was completed in 2011 to enhance public access to the institution's resources. On Central Park West, windows were lengthened to form new doorway entrances, with views into the main gallery, and windows were expanded. To establish "a street presence," the society has installed life-size bronze sculptures outside the building—Abraham Lincoln on Central Park West, Frederick Douglass on West 77th Street—national figures with connections to New York.

After reopening, the Historical Society offered a multimedia installation of major themes of American history through stories and figures from New York's past. It also has a new section for an interactive children's history museum.

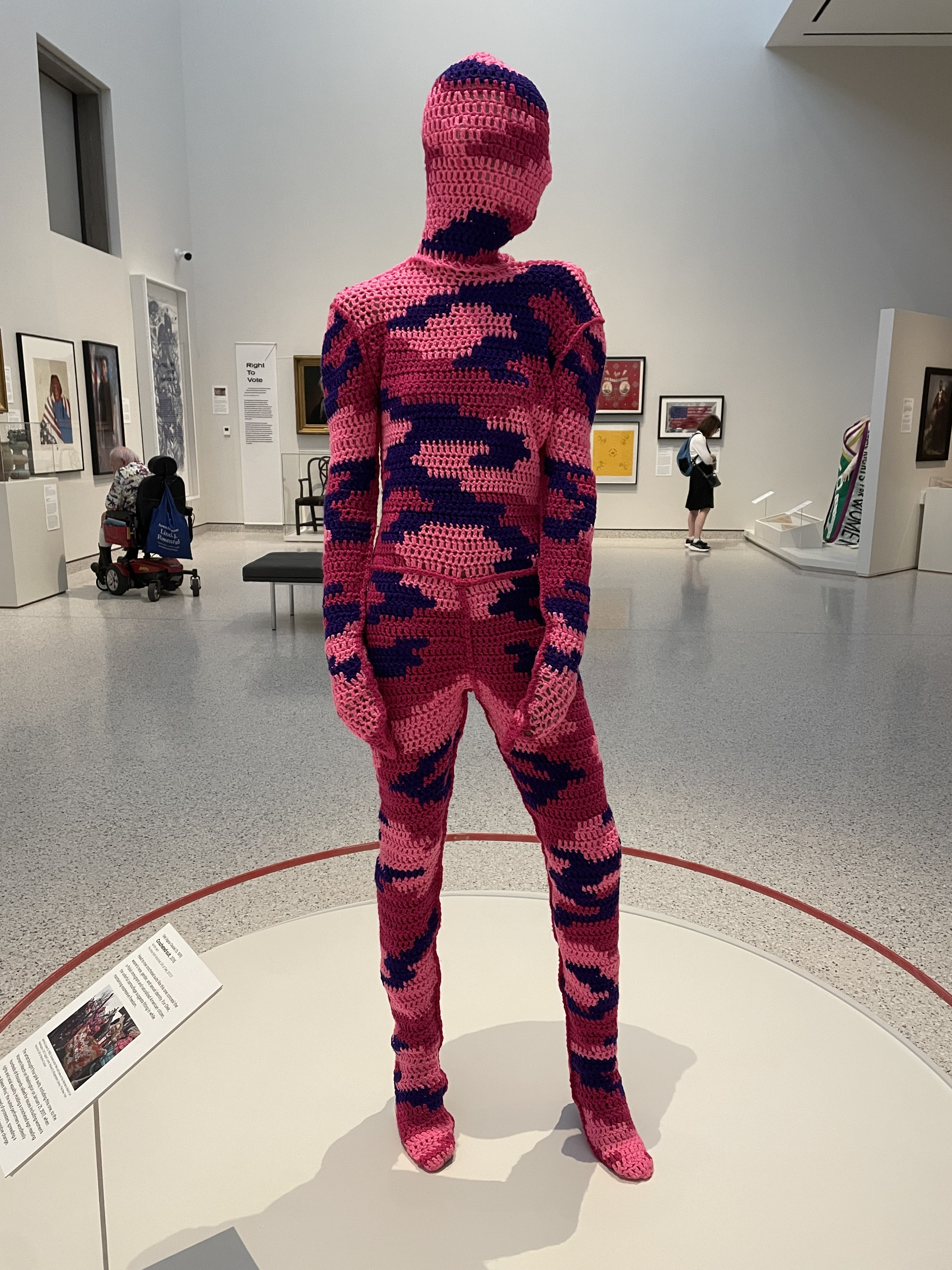
Democracy Matters exhibition (2026) featuring a pink camouflage crocheted bodysuit by Olek

In 2023, the New York Historical Society began constructing the 80,000-square-foot (7,400 m^{2}) Tang Wing, designed by Robert A. M. Stern and featuring collections on LGBTQ+ history. Construction topped out in May 2025. The new wing opened to the public on June 18, 2026 with the inaugural exhibition Democracy Matters.

== Branding ==
The Historical Society used an archaic spelling of the name "New York" from its founding to 2024, hyphenating the city's name as "New-York," which was common in the 19th century when the institution was founded. The hyphen was still used in the 21st century to give the Historical Society a unique identity. In October 2024, however, the organization announced that it would be rebranding itself as New York Historical. The elimination of the word "Society" was intended "to signal that the institution is welcoming to all." The new logo, a stylized "H" designed by Lippincott, "reflects the history of New York state and Indigenous cultures of the United States".

== Book prizes ==
The New York Historical gives three book prizes annually. From 2005 to 2012, there was one award for American history. A second award was added in 2013 for children's history. A third award was added in 2016 for military history.

== Presidents ==
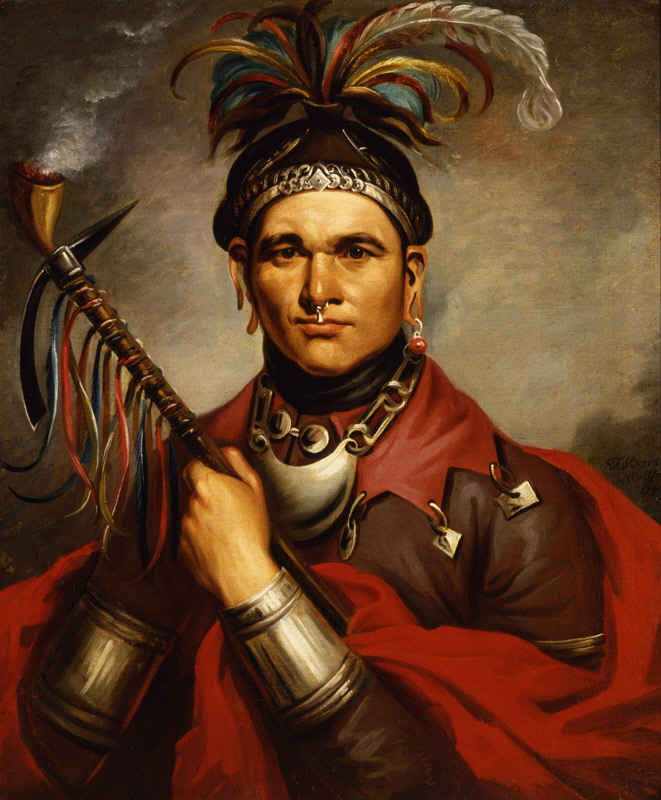
Corn Planter, Seneca war chief, by F. Bratoli, 1796

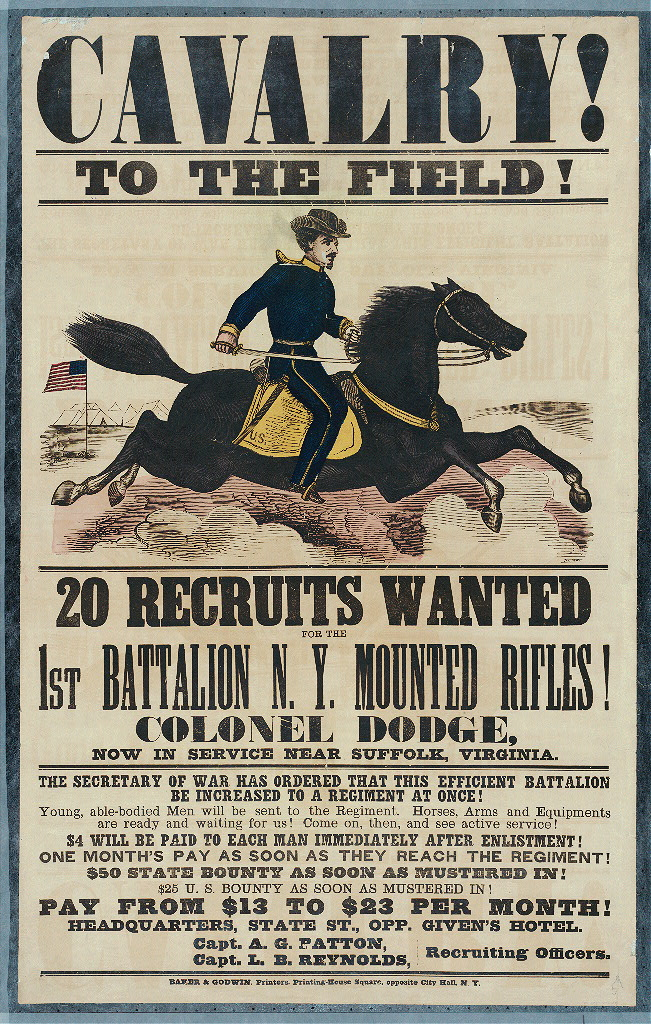
A recruiting poster for the First Battalion, New York Mounted Rifles, New York Historical collection

- Louise Mirrer, 2004–present
- Kenneth T. Jackson, 2001–2004
- Betsy Gotbaum, 1994–2001
- Norman Pearlstine, 1992–1994
- Barbara Knowles Debs, 1989–1992
- Albert L. Key, 1987–1989
- Robert Guestier Goelet, 1971–1987
- Frederick B. Adams, Jr., 1963–1970
- Irving S. Olds, 1962–1963
- Leroy E. Kimball, 1956–1962
- Fenwick Beekman, 1947–1956
- George Albert Zabriskie, 1939–1947
- John Abeel Weekes, 1913–1939
- Samuel Verplanck Hoffman, 1903–1912
- Eugene Augustus Hoffman, 1901–1902
- John Alsop King, 1887–1900
- Benjamin Hazard Field, 1885–1886
- Augustus Schell, 1883–1884
- Frederic DePeyster, 1873–1882
- Augustus Schell, 1872
- Thomas DeWitt, 1869–1871
- Hamilton Fish, 1867–1869
- Frederic DePeyster, 1864–1866
- Luther Bradish, 1850–1863
- Albert Gallatin, 1843–1849
- Peter Augustus Jay, 1840–1842
- Peter Gerard Stuyvesant, 1836–1839
- Morgan Lewis, 1832–1835
- James Kent, 1828–1831
- David Hosack, 1820–1827
- DeWitt Clinton, 1817–19
- Gouverneur Morris, 1816
- Egbert Benson, 1805–1815

== See also ==
- The Course of Empire
- History of New York (state)
- History of New York City
- List of historical societies in New York (state)
- List of museums and cultural institutions in New York City
- List of New York City Designated Landmarks in Manhattan from 59th to 110th Streets
