= Harvard Journal on Legislation =

- Discipline: Law review
- Language: English

Publication details
- History: 1964 to present
- Publisher: Harvard Law School ( (United States) USA)
- Frequency: Semiannually (Twice each year, Winter and Summer)

Standard abbreviations
- Bluebook: Harv. J. on Legis.
- ISO 4: Harv. J. Legis.

Indexing
- ISSN: 0017-808X

Links
- Journal homepage; HJOL Archive: Vols. 36 and later; HeinOnline Archive: all Vols.

The Harvard Journal on Legislation is a journal of legal scholarship published by students at Harvard Law School.

== Overview ==
The Harvard Journal on Legislation publishes articles analyzing legislation and the legislative process. The Journal specializes in articles focusing on the organizational and procedural factors affecting the efficiency and effectiveness of legislative decisionmaking. In particular, the Journal aims to publish articles that address legislative reform or that examine public policy problems of nationwide significance and propose legislation to resolve such problems. Articles are written by leading academics and practitioners, as well as by Harvard Law School students. The Journal's biannual Congress Issue includes policy essays written by sitting members of the U.S. Congress. The Journal is generally ranked among the top 50 most influential student-edited law journals.

The Harvard Journal on Legislation is published semiannually (Winter and Summer) by Harvard Law School students. Additionally, the Journal holds an annual Symposium featuring discussion of a policy issue of national significance.

Student editors need not participate in a competition to join the Journal, though senior Journal editors are selected largely through an application and interviewing process. Upper-level masthead positions are filled by election.

The Harvard Journal on Legislation maintains an office on the Harvard Law School campus in Wasserstein Hall.

== History ==
The Harvard Journal on Legislation published its first issue in 1964. The Journal—along with the Harvard Civil Rights-Civil Liberties Law Review and the Harvard International Law Journal—was founded by Harvard Law School Dean Erwin N. Griswold to provide students who were not members of the Harvard Law Review with an opportunity to gain similar writing and editing experience. The Harvard Journal on Legislation was originally affiliated with the Harvard Student Legislative Research Bureau at Harvard Law School. In addition to printing articles written on legislative matters by academics, attorneys in private practice, and government officials, the Journal published draft statutes and accompanying analyses prepared by student members of the Harvard Student Legislative Research Bureau.

By 1969, the Journal had expanded beyond the Legislative Research Bureau to become "a full-scale law review operation." It also became the first of the Harvard Law School Journals to accept first-year students as members of its staff.
