= Educational accreditation =

Quality assurance process

Educational accreditation is a quality assurance process under which services and operations of educational institutions or programs are evaluated and verified by an external body to determine whether applicable and recognized standards are met. If standards are met, accredited status is granted by the appropriate agency.

In most countries, the function of educational accreditation is conducted by a government organization, such as the Ministry of Education. The United States government instead delegates the quality assurance process to private non-profit organizations. Those organizations are formally called accreditors. In order to receive federal funding and any other type of federal recognition, all accreditors in the US must, in turn, be recognized by the National Advisory Committee on Institutional Quality and Integrity (NACIQI), which is an advisory body to the U.S. Secretary of Education. The federal government is, therefore, still the top-level architect and controlling authority of accreditation. The U.S. accreditation process was developed in the late 19th century and early 20th century after educational institutions perceived a need for improved coordination and articulation between secondary and post-secondary educational institutions, along with standardization of requirements between the two levels.

== In higher education ==
Accreditation of higher education varies by jurisdiction and may focus on either or both the institution and the individual programs of study.

Higher education accreditation in the United States has long been established as a peer review process coordinated by accreditation commissions and member institutions. The federal government began to play a limited role in higher education accreditation in 1952 with the reauthorization of the GI Bill for Korean War veterans. With the creation of the U.S. Department of Education and under the terms of the Higher Education Act of 1965, as amended, the U.S. Secretary of Education is required by law to publish a list of nationally recognized accrediting agencies for higher education.

Higher Education extends beyond the United States. Within North America, Canada has agencies such as EQual Accreditation, overseen by Accreditation Canada, that ensures programs meet national benchmarks for educational excellence and quality standards for health education programs. Mexico has similar agencies such as the Conseo para la Accreditation de la Education Superior (COPAES) for academic programs in Mexican Higher Education.

In the European Union, the European Association for Quality Assurance in Higher Education registers quality assurance agencies that provide accreditation.

== In primary and secondary education ==
In the United States, there is no federal government list of recognized accreditation agencies for primary and secondary schools like there is for higher education. Public schools must adhere to criteria set by the state governments, and there is wide variation among the individual states in the requirements applied to non-public primary and secondary schools. There are seven regional accreditors in the United States that have historically accredited elementary schools, junior high schools, middle schools, high schools, as well as institutions of higher education. Some of the regional accreditors, such as, Middle States Association of Colleges and Schools, International Association for Learner Driven Schools (IALDS), New England Association of Schools and Colleges, Western Association of Schools and Colleges, AdvancED, and some independent associations, such as the Association of Christian Schools International and Council of Islamic Schools of North America (CISNA), have expanded their accreditation activity to include schools outside the United States.

== See also ==
- Academic achievement
- Academic standards
