= Casey Trees =

US non-profit organization

Casey Trees Logo

Casey Trees is a non-profit organization established in 2001 to restore, enhance, and protect the tree canopy of Washington, D.C. The organization plants trees, engages volunteers in tree planting and care, offers an education program open to the public, monitors the District's tree canopy, and advocates and plans for the urban forest.

To restore District of Columbia's legacy as the "City of Trees," the organization works with residents, community groups, policy makers, agencies and others to plant and care for trees and promote the use of green infrastructure for environmentally friendly and sustainable development. Casey Trees collaborates with the District Department of Transportation's Urban Forestry Administration and has participated in revising the District's Comprehensive Plan and partnered with the District on the Main Streets and Great Streets initiatives and is designing their new location in Brookland to utilize green building practices.

== History ==
Casey Trees was created in 2001 with a grant from philanthropist Betty Brown Casey. Following a 1999 Washington Post article with a satellite imagery analysis from American Forests, finding that the "District of Columbia...lost 64% of its tree cover from 1985 to 1997," Mrs. Casey was moved to establish an organization that would work to restore the tree cover of the District of Columbia.

Casey Trees' first major initiative in 2002 was to inventory all of DC's street trees. Over 500 volunteers and 35 university student interns conducted a comprehensive GIS inventory of 106,000 street trees and 25,000 empty planting spaces. These findings were used by the Urban Forestry Administration to establish street tree planting goals, priorities, and maintenance needs. The information was also used to develop an online tree map which allows residents to view the data.

== Programs ==
Every fall and spring, Casey Trees helps organize Community Tree Planting projects in the city, which plant approximately 850 trees annually. The organization works with neighborhood groups and Citizen Foresters to plan these projects and recruit community volunteers to plant the new trees. The organization provides trees, technical assistance to help neighborhood groups choose suitable trees for the planting locations, and tools and assistance to plant the trees.

The Citizen Forester program trains participants in best practices for planting and caring for trees, conducting tree inventories, and advocating for a green, sustainable DC. At 500 and growing, Citizen Foresters serve as ambassadors; they oversee planting, training, and other activities District-wide.

The High School Summer Crew provides area high school students with summer employment watering, weeding, mulching and monitoring the condition of Casey Trees-planted trees across DC. The students care for newly planted trees that have been in the ground less than three years, which require 25 gallons of water a week to survive. The summer crew waters the trees during weeks when less than 1.5 inches of rain falls.

Under a grant from the District of Columbia Department of Environment (DDOE) RiverSmart Homes program, Casey Trees plants shade trees for homeowners participating in the program at a cost to homeowners of $50 per tree.
