= William Drea Adams =

American academic administrator

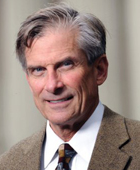

10th Chair of the National Endowment for the Humanities
- In office July 2014 – May 2017
- President: Barack Obama; Donald Trump
- Deputy: Carole M. Watson
- Preceded by: Jim Leach
- Succeeded by: Jon Parrish Peede

19th President of Colby College
- In office 2000–2014
- Preceded by: William R. Cotter
- Succeeded by: David A. Greene

14th President of Bucknell University
- In office 1995–2000
- Preceded by: Gary Allan Sojka
- Succeeded by: Steffen H. Rogers

Personal details
- Born: Birmingham, Michigan, U.S.
- Spouse: Lauren Sterling
- Education: Colorado College (BA); University of California, Santa Cruz (PhD)

Military service
- Allegiance: United States
- Branch/service: United States Army
- Battles/wars: Vietnam War

William Drea Adams is an American educator and advocate for the humanities. He was the tenth Chair of the National Endowment for the Humanities from 2014 to 2017. He served as the 14th President of Bucknell University from 1995 to 2000, and as the 19th President of Colby College from 2000 to 2014.

== Early life and education ==
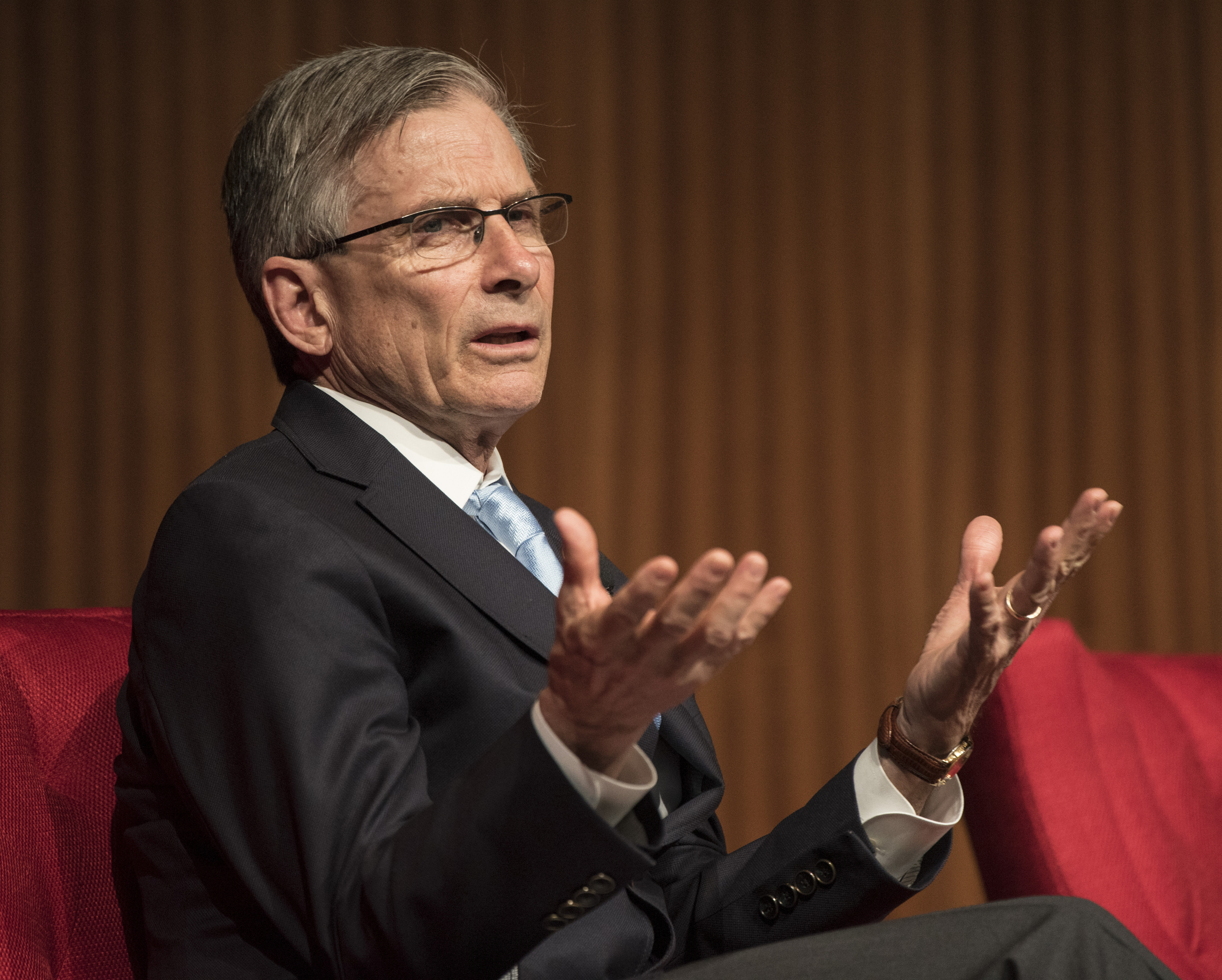
Adams at the LBJ Presidential Library in 2016

Adams was born in Birmingham, Michigan, attended the Holderness School, and began undergraduate studies at Colorado College. He left the school and served for three years in the United States Army, including one year in Vietnam as an infantry advisor in the Mekong Delta, but returned to graduate in 1972 magna cum laude. He subsequently spent a year in France as a Fulbright fellow, studying at the Ecole des Hautes Etudes and the École Normale Supérieure before earning a Ph.D. in the History of Consciousness program at the University of California, Santa Cruz in 1982.

== Career ==
Adams began his professorial career as a visiting assistant professor of political science at the University of North Carolina at Chapel Hill and then Santa Clara University. In 1986 he moved to Stanford University where he coordinated the Great Works in Western Culture program. He earned his nickname, Bro, from his father, in memory of a friend who died in World War II. In 1988 he took an administrative position at Wesleyan University, eventually becoming the vice president from 1993 to 1995. Adams authored a PhD dissertation in history of consciousness titled Digging in the same place: an essay in the political and social philosophy of Maurice Merleau-Ponty (1982).

He served five years as president of Bucknell University in Pennsylvania from 1995 to 2000, and became Colby College's 19th president on July 1, 2000.

Adams served as a director of the Maine Public Broadcasting Network from 2002 to 2012, Wittenberg University from 2007 to 2011, and the Unitil Corporation since 2009. President Obama announced his intention to nominate Adams to be the tenth Chair of the National Endowment for the Humanities in April 2014, and the nomination was confirmed by the Senate in July 2014. Adams resigned his NEH appointment in May 2017, citing accomplishments in the public humanities under the NEH Common Good initiative and the transition in federal administrations.

Government offices
Preceded by Jim Leach	Chairperson of the National Endowment for the Humanities; 2014–2017	Succeeded by Jon Parrish Peede
