= Teaching kit (museum) =

A teaching kit is a teaching resource developed by a museum education department with to create cross-curricular learning. Such kits often include many resources, such as an educators' guide, a CD-ROM with works of art and primary sources (letters, maps, period photographs), overhead transparencies, posters, curricula, and step-by-step lesson plans. The projects are founded on the belief that art and material culture can be a valuable lens through which to study a historical moment.

As N. Elizabeth Schlatter, the author of Museum Careers: A Practical Guide for Students and Novices, explains, the role of museums is to make “a unique contribution to the public by collecting, preserving, and interpreting the things of this world." She notes how the scholar Stephen Weil has said that museums have changed their mission to educating the visitor rather than having a primary mission of object care. Out of this growing trend, Education Departments have become one of the most vital parts of the museum organization. They seek to bring the knowledge of the museum to the community through more public programs and programs designed to be used in traditional classroom curricula.

The Phillips Collection in Washington, DC, USA, is an example of a museum with a strong program of creating teaching kits. Their teaching kits focus on works of art and exhibitions at The Phillips Collection. The education department works with mentor teachers and advisors from schools. As they explain on their website, “arts education is a valuable window on subjects such as history, math, English, English as a second language, and geography.”

The New York Metropolitan Museum of Art’s Education Department has also created programs, workshops and printed and electronic resources for teachers to integrate art into their daily curricula. The Whitney Museum of American Art in New York City, NY, USA, has an extensive family education program as well. For their recent Georgia O'Keeffe: Abstraction show, family kits with flowers, colored pencils and a gallery guide were given at the coat check desk. Similarly for the 2010 Biennial a family guide is offered.

The US National Endowment for the Humanities has also contributed to this trend with a program called Picturing America, a set of forty, carefully selected works of art spanning several centuries—all by American painters, sculptors, photographers, and architects. NEH Chairman Bruce Cole said, “Picturing America helps us understand our democracy by bringing us face to face with the people, places, and events that have shaped our country. It provides an innovative way to experience America's history through our nation's art.” The NEH program includes a resource book, lesson plans, and large, high-quality reproductions of these images. According to their website, it can be used to enhance the study of American history, social studies, language arts, literature, and civics.
