= The Shakers (film) =

- Directed by: Tom Davenport
- Produced by: Tom Davenport & Frank DeCola
- Narrated by: Tom Davenport
- Cinematography: Tom Davenport
- Edited by: Louise B. Stieg
- Production companies: Davenport Films; Curriculum in Folklore, UNC at Chapel Hill
- Release date: 1974
- Running time: 30 minutes
- Country: United States
- Language: English

The Shakers is a 1974 documentary film directed by Tom Davenport and produced by Davenport and Frank DeCola. It studies the last dozen remaining Shakers in their communities, focusing on their daily lives, music, and spirituality, as well as containing Shaker history and interviews with Shakers. It received positive reviews from critics, and won a Blue Ribbon at the 1975 American Film Festival.

== Synopsis ==
The Shakers opens with the Narrator, Tom Davenport, reading a quote Benson John Lossing from an 1857 edition of Harper's New Monthly Magazine, speaking of the order, neatness, and beauty of a Shaker community. "Simple Gifts" is sung by several Shaker women while the camera pans over Sabbathday Lake Shaker Village. Shots of Shaker sisters sweeping, cooking, filling bird feeders, and washing clothes are shown, with numerous cuts to show historical images of the Shakers accompanied by the Narrator discussing their growth and decline.

The film then cuts to inside the main dwelling house of Canterbury Shaker Village, and films Sister Lillian Phelps discussing her life and decision to join the Shakers. Sister Mildred Barker is heard singing while the Narrator speaks about Shaker worship and music. The film then cuts to Shaker women in both communities speaking about celibacy and Shaker community life. Then, Sister Mildred Barker is heard singing "I Never Did Believe", after which, the Narrator is heard describing Shaker theology and Mother Ann Lee, the leader of the Shakers. Shaker women are then shown further explaining Shaker beliefs, as well as Mother Ann's journey to the United States and the subsequent spread of Shaker communities.

After Sister Mildred Barker's rendition of "Come Life, Shaker Life", the film cut to Shaker women discussing vocations to the Shakers, and the Shakers' communal lifestyle. Sister Mildred was then shown singing "With a New Tongue", before switching to the Narrator's reading of the Shakers' Millennial Laws of 1845 regarding church leadership. The film then shows a conversation between Sabbathday Lake Shakers about the outside world's misconceptions of Shaker life. Eldress Marguerite Frost of the Canterbury community is then shown singing, and speaking of the humility the hymns brings. The Narrator then discusses a religious revival that occurred in the middle of the 19th century.

The film then focuses on Sister Mildred Barker, who discusses her childhood friendship with an elderly Shaker sister, who asked of her on her deathbed to become a Shaker. Sister Mildred agreed, but took a while to figure out what that meant, she says, and goes on to sing a song taught to her by the old sister. The film then cuts to Sister Lillian Phelps explaining the value of business and occupation in Shakerism, and the Narrator describing Shaker ingenuity and entrepreneurship. Then, the film shows the two Shaker eldresses at Canterbury discussing the decision not to admit new members to the Shakers, before cutting to a worship service at Sabbathday Lake. The film ends with the Sabbathday Lake Shakers singing the hymn "O, Brighter than the Morning Star".

== Production ==
=== Development and pre-production ===
Davenport learned of the Shakers in the mid-1960s, when he came across a book of Shaker photographs. He then contacted Frank DeCola, a friend and colleague with whom he had previously made a film with. Davenport recalled the experience later, when interviewed by Sharon R. Sherman for her book Documenting Ourselves: Film, Video, and Culture:

"I worked with a fellow by the name of Frank DeCola on the film about New Orleans jazz... I'd gone to the Far East, come back... In Japan I'd been visiting the Zen temples, and I liked the architectural style. I was very interested in that. I was very interested in Zen generally. And I was looking for some kind of, I guess, equivalent in my own culture that I could draw on, and I came across a book of Shaker photographs. And I said, 'Gee, these things look like Zen temples. They're all so simple.' They were these really great pictures. And so I was talking to my friend Frank, and he said, 'Gee, I've been thinking about it. I really love the music.' He was a composer and musician.

Frank was an editor, and I was a photographer. He was going to have primary responsibility on the film. I'm sure that I basically felt that I'd better stay out of it, because, you know, you can't go around telling an editor what to do if he's a co-filmmaker with you. If he's working for you that's another thing. But if he's not, it's very presumptuous to go on unless you have a very good working relationship, because it's usually during the editorial stages that you have your disagreements about where the film should go. So I felt that Frank was going to finish the film however he felt he wanted to. And I had moved down to Virginia at that time, and he got sick."

DeCola died before during the early stages of production, and Davenport finished the film alone.

Davenport began work on the film project about the Shakers as early as 1967, when he started amassing a collection of articles, books, and pamphlets on the Shakers, as well as diaries of individual Shakers, which he would continue doing until 1974. In 1969 he commenced correspondence with folklorist and Shaker scholar David Patterson, as well as with members of the two Shaker communities in existence at the time, Canterbury and Sabbathday Lake. He also began assembling a collection of about 125 photographs for use in the film, drawing from the collections of Ovile Austin, the Winterthur Museum, the Fruitlands Museum, the Library of Congress, the Manchester Public Library, the New-York Historical Society, Elmer Ray Pearson, and the Shaker Museum and Library.

Funding for the production was gained from grants to the American Craft Council from Ann Rockefeller Coste, a philanthropist and member of the Rockefeller family, and the National Endowment for the Humanities.

=== Filming and post-production ===
In 1970, after being granted permission by the Shakers, Davenport began filming. On 19 May 1970 he visited Canterbury Shaker Village, where he interviewed and filmed several of the Shakers there: Eldress Marguerite Frost, Sister Lillian Phelps, and Sister Bertha Lindsay. From 1970 until 1972, Davenport made multiple trips to Sabbathday Lake Shaker Village, where he interviewed and filmed several of the village's Shakers: Sister Mildred Barker, Sister Elsie McCool, Sister Frances Carr, and Sister Elizabeth Dunn. At Sabbathday Lake, he spent a good deal of time filming Sister Mildred Barker, who had wide-ranging knowledge of Shaker music, and who sang many Shaker hymns, some of which were quite obscure. In addition, on 18 July 1971, Davenport filmed a Shaker worship service at Sabbathday Lake, possibly the first time Shaker worship had ever been filmed. About 120 of the short clips Davenport filmed ended up being used in the finished film.

During the end of the filming, however, an issue arose which jeopardized the situation of the project. Conflict arose between the two communities, Canterbury Shaker Society, and Sabbathday Lake Shaker Society, over the decision of Canterbury, the headquarters of Shaker leadership, to bar new members from entering the Shakers. Sabbathday Lake, which was home to a handful of new converts, protested the decision. The relationship between the communities was so damaged that the members of the two refused to even see each other, even on the bicentennial celebration of the Shakers' arrival in the United States. This posed a challenge for Davenport, as he had already filmed at both locations, and now had to account for the portrayal of each community and its views on Shaker administration and theology in relation to the other. He decided not to include any mention on the controversy in the film, focusing on Shaker life before the issue arose.

David Patterson, the Shaker scholar who helped in the production of the film, recalled the experience and the challenges it posed for Davenport, saying:

Well, the problem that developed in the film that was kind of an ethnographic nightmare was that the two communities split while he [Davenport] was in the editing process, and well, I guess, before all the filming had been done, over the issue of admitting another member... Now, how is Tom supposed to complete the film? The people at Sabbathday Lake wanted the film to say their position. The people at Canterbury wanted their position. Canterbury didn't want the people who were now apostates of Sabbathday Lake even in the film, and Sabbathday Lake wanted to make this apostatizing vehicle, I think. And Tom was just in a terrible dilemma because he wanted to finish the film. So his decision was to cut; make it as though the film ended at the point where he began work, when they began work with the film, and stop it before the controversy arose. Which was another dilemma, because the story was breaking in the press... Of course, when it was over, both of us felt disappointed that the film couldn't please the Shakers.

Filmed on a 16 mm film gauge, the finished documentary, titled The Shakers, was 30 minutes long and in color. It was produced by Davenport Films and the Curriculum in Folklore at the University of North Carolina at Chapel Hill.

== Release ==
The Shakers was released in spring 1974. It shown on local public television channels, as well as a broadcast on PBS.

== Reception ==
The Shakers was well received by critics, both at the time of its release as well as in later years. A review by Jane Boutwell in the 5 August 1974 issue of The New Yorker dubbed it "the definitive film on the Shaker movement" and a "poetic evocation of Shaker life." Richard Harrington in a March 1989 article in The Washington Post called it a "definitive portrait [of the Shakers]." Merrill Sheils of Newsweek called it “a touching, and probably final, glimpse of the Shakers,” underscoring the importance of the film. Gary R. Edgerton in his 2001 book Ken Burns's America: Packaging the Past for Television described The Shakers as "arguably the definitive motion picture portrait of the Shakers up to that time."

=== Awards ===
Year	Award	Category	Recipient	Outcome	Source
1975	American Film Festival	Blue Ribbon	The Shakers	Won	
1975	CINE	Golden Eagle	The Shakers	Won	

== Home media ==
The Shakers is available on VHS, sold by PBS as part of their "The American Traditional Culture Series". The film is available online for streaming at Folkstreams.net.

== Soundtrack ==
The soundtrack of The Shakers consisted entirely of traditional Shaker songs sung by Shakers.

=== Track listing ===
1. "Simple Gifts" – sung by group of Sabbathday Lake Shakers
2. "How Lovely are the Faithful Souls" – sung by Sister Mildred Barker
3. "I Never Did Believe" – sung by Sister Mildred Barker
4. "Come Life, Shaker Life" – sung by Sister Mildred Barker
5. "With a New Tongue " – sung by Sister Mildred Barker
6. "Let Me Have Mother's Gospel" – sung by Sister Mildred Barker, Sister Frances Carr & Sister Elsie McCool
7. "Yielding and Simple" – sung by Eldress Marguerite Frost
8. "Who Will Bow and Blow like the Willow" – sung by a group of Sabbathday Lake Shakers
9. "Mother Has Come with Her Beautiful Song" – sung by Sister Mildred Barker
10. "Gratitude" – sung by Eldress Bertha Lindsay, accompanied by Sister Lillian Phelps on the piano
11. "O Holy Father" – sung by group of Sabbathday Lake Shakers
12. "O, Brighter than the Morning Star" – sung by group of Sabbathday Lake Shakers
