= Carole Watson =

Carole M. Watson
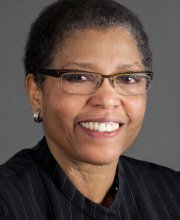

Chair of the National Endowment for the Humanities Acting
- In office 2013–2014
- President: Barack Obama
- Preceded by: Jim Leach
- Succeeded by: William Drea Adams
- In office 2009
- President: Barack Obama
- Preceded by: Bruce Cole
- Succeeded by: Jim Leach

Personal details
- Born: Kansas
- Education: Pittsburg State University (BA); Saint Louis University (MA); George Washington University (PhD)

Carole McAlpine Watson is an American academic who served twice as acting Chair of the National Endowment for the Humanities, first in 2009 and again in 2013 to 2014. Watson studied African American literature and authored Her Prologue, a scholarly bibliography of novels by African American women published between 1859 and 1965.

== Early life and education ==
Watson was born in Kansas. She holds a bachelor's degree from Pittsburg State University, a Master's in English and American literature from Saint Louis University, and a PhD in American cultural history from George Washington University. She was a Fellow of the Council for Excellence in Government (1991).

== Career ==
Watson began her career as an academic and educator. She directed Inter-cultural Programs at the Lindenwood Colleges in Saint Charles, Missouri and was the founding chair of the English department at the Abraham Lincoln Opportunity School in St. Louis, Missouri. Her academic work investigated the history of novels published by Black women in the nineteenth and twentieth centuries. Reflecting on the work, Watson noted that many of the novels reflected the social structure of the era: "I found that most of the novels weren’t any good—they were written to put a positive face on African-American life for white audiences or to serve as exemplars for African-American readers. They were full of principles of behavior."

As Deputy Chair of the National Endowment for the Humanities (NEH), Watson has exercised leadership in strengthening the role and importance of the humanities. According to the National Journal, Watson has "done her part to obliterate the distinction between hard and soft fields of inquiry" and moved NEH forward through the National Digital Newspaper Program, a humanities "equivalent of the Human Genome Project. In collaboration with the Library of Congress, the agency is digitizing a hundred years of reportage: every article published by an American newspaper between 1836 and 1922."

Watson has twice served as Acting Chair of the National Endowment for the Humanities. She first directed the agency in an interim capacity in 2009, prior to the appointment of Jim Leach. Following Leach's retirement, she again served as acting chair from 2013 to 2014. In 2013, Watson brokered a memorandum of understanding with the United States Department of State, which allowed for the distribution of documentaries created with NEH support to be distributed through the State Department's "American Corners" library program around the world. In 2014, Watson organized Standing Together, an NEH funding initiative that aims to "help Americans understand the experiences of service members as they return to civilian life."
