= Chair of the National Endowment for the Humanities =

Executive leader

Chair of the National Endowment for the Humanities of United States Government
- Incumbent; Michael McDonald (Acting) since March 12, 2025
- National Endowment for the Humanities
- Style: Mister or Madam
- Member of: National Council on the Humanities
- Reports to: President of the United States
- Seat: Washington, D.C.
- Nominator: President of the United States
- Term length: 4 years; Typically changes with the election of a new president.
- Constituting instrument: Humanities Act of 1965 (Pub. L. 89–209)
- Formation: 1966
- First holder: Barnaby Keeney
- Deputy: Deputy Chair

The chair of the National Endowment for the Humanities (NEH) is the executive leader of the National Endowment for the Humanities, an independent federal agency created in 1965. The chair directs the NEH and is the sole position in the agency with the legal authority to make grants and awards. The NEH chair is appointed by the president and confirmed by the Senate. The appointment and term of the chair are statutorily defined in 20 U.S.C. § 956(b), and the chair's authority is defined throughout 20 U.S.C. § 956. The National Council on the Humanities, a board of 26 private citizens who are also appointed by the President and confirmed by the Senate, advises the chair.

== List of chairpersons ==
- Barnaby Keeney, 1963–1965, Chair of National Commission on the Humanities
- Henry Allen Moe, Interim, 1965–66
- Barnaby Keeney, 1966–1970
- Wallace Edgerton, Acting, 1970–71
- Ronald Berman, 1971–1977
- Robert Kingston, Acting, 1977
- Joseph Duffey, 1977–81
- William J. Bennett, 1981–85
- John Agresto, Acting, 1985
- Lynne Cheney, 1986–1993
- Jerry L. Martin, Acting, 1993
- Donald Gibson, Acting, 1993
- Sheldon Hackney, 1993–97
- Bruce A. Lehman, Acting, 1997
- William R. Ferris, 1997–2001
- Bruce Cole, 2001–2009
- Carole Watson, Acting, 2009
- Jim Leach, 2009–2013
- Carole Watson, Acting, 2013–2014
- William 'Bro' Adams, 2014–2017
- Margaret "Peggy" Plympton, Acting, 2017–2018
- Jon Parrish Peede, 2018–2021
- Adam Wolfson, Acting, 2021–2022
- Shelly Lowe, 2022–2025
- Michael Patrick McDonald (born 1956), Acting, 2025–2026; then 2026–present
