= Shelly Lowe =

American academic administrator

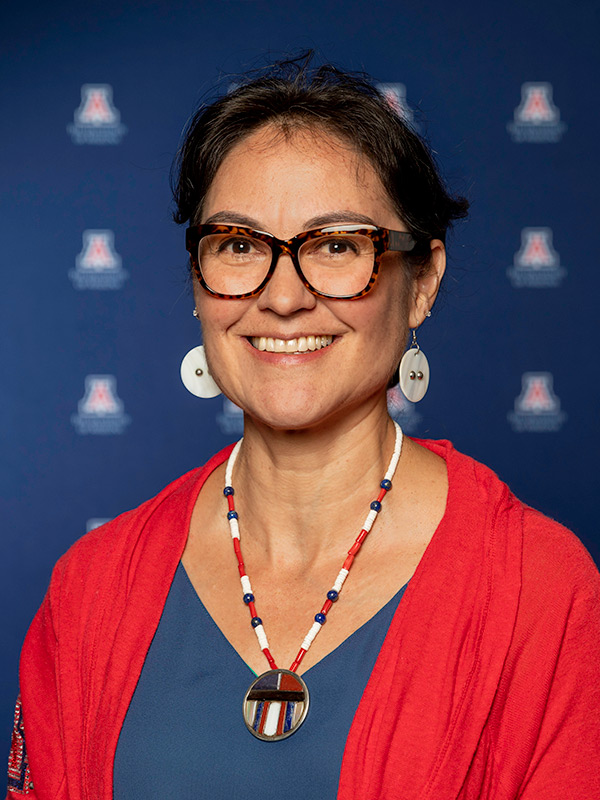

Chair of the National Endowment for the Humanities
- In office February 14, 2022 – March 12, 2025
- President: Joe Biden; Donald Trump
- Preceded by: Jon Parrish Peede
- Succeeded by: Michael McDonald

Personal details
- Born: 1974 or 1975 (age 51–52)
- Education: University of Arizona (BA, MA)

Shelly C. Lowe is an American academic administrator who served as a member and then chair of the National Endowment for the Humanities.

== Early life and education ==
Lowe is a citizen of the Navajo Nation and grew up on the central part of the reservation in Ganado, Arizona. Lowe graduated from Ganado High School and was awarded a full-ride four-year Flinn Scholarship. She earned a Bachelor of Arts degree in sociology and Master of Arts in Native American studies from the University of Arizona.

== Career ==
Lowe has worked as executive director of the Harvard University Native American Program, assistant dean of Yale College, director of the Yale University Native American Cultural Center, and graduate program facilitator of the American Indian Studies program at the University of Arizona. She was appointed to serve as a member of the National Endowment for the Humanities by President Barack Obama in 2015 and as chair of the NEH by President Joe Biden in 2021. She was confirmed by the United States Senate on February 2, 2022, and sworn into office on February 14. She is the first Native American to head the NEH.

On March 12, 2025, Lowe left her position on the NEH at the direction of the president.

== Selected publications ==
- Waterman, Stephanie J.; Lowe, Shelly C.; Shotton, Heather J. (2018). Beyond Access: Indigenizing Programs for Native American Student Success. ISBN 9781620362884. OCLC 1036726367.
- Shotton, Heather J.; Lowe, Shelly C.; Waterman, Stephanie J. (2013). Beyond the Asterisk: Understanding Native Students in Higher Education. ISBN 9781579226244. OCLC 903293330.
- Serving Native American students. San Francisco: Jossey-Bass. 2005. ISBN 9780787979713. OCLC 58843943.
