= Tom Davenport (filmmaker) =

American filmmaker and film distributor

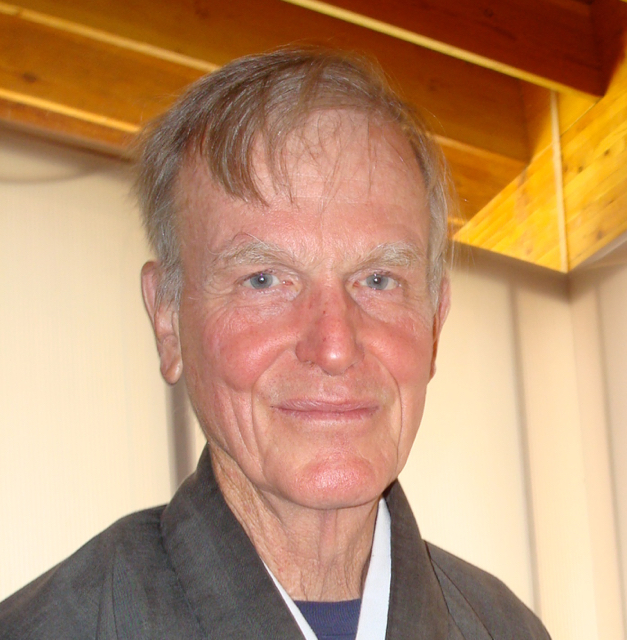
- Davenport in 2010
- Born: Tom Davenport; June 13, 1939 (age 87)
- Education: Yale University; University of Hawaiʻi at Mānoa
- Occupations: Documentary filmmaker Film distributor

Tom Davenport (born June 13, 1939) is an independent filmmaker and film distributor who has worked for decades documenting American life and exploring folklore. Currently based in Delaplane, Virginia, he is the founder and project director for Folkstreams, a website that houses independent documentary films about American folk roots and cultures.

In the winter 2016, Davenport released his follow-up film to his profile of a North Carolina family, A Singing Stream (1986) which he made in partnership with the Landis family who were featured in that film. In 2018, he released a documentary on a 1932 lynching near his home in Fauquier County in Virginia. He continues to oversee the Folkstreams website, as well as help with the management of his family farm in northern Virginia at Hollin Farms.

== Early life and education ==
Davenport grew up in Virginia outside Washington, D.C. He received his bachelor's degree in English from Yale University in 1961. After graduating, Davenport was hired through the Yale-China program, which sent him to Hong Kong to teach English at New Asia College for two years.

Davenport went on to study Chinese at the East–West Center at the University of Hawaiʻi at Mānoa. As part of that program, he spent a year in Taiwan, where he took an interest in Zen meditation that has continued since.

== Film career ==
Back in the United States in the late 1960s, Davenport moved to New York City, where he worked as an apprentice with renowned documentary filmmakers Richard Leacock and D.A. Pennebaker. Davenport later returned to Taiwan, taking pictures for National Geographic. While there, Davenport shot footage for his first independent film, T'ai Chi Ch'uan, on the Chinese martial art of tai chi, which he released in 1969.

In 1970, Davenport settled in Delaplane, Virginia, on his family's land. The following year, he founded an independent film company, Davenport Films, along with his wife, co-producer and designer, Mimi Davenport. The company gained recognition through "From the Brothers Grimm," a series of live-action adaptations of traditional folktales translated into American settings. As fairy tale scholar Jack Zipes notes in The Enchanted Screen (2011), through these films, Davenport "made original use of the fairy tale and film to enhance viewers' understanding of storytelling, politics, and creativity."

In 1974, Davenport and Frank DeCola directed and produced, along with Daniel Patterson, a 30-minute documentary called The Shakers, which The New Yorker Magazine dubbed "the definitive film on the Shaker movement." Newsweek called it "a touching, and probably final, glimpse of the Shakers," underscoring the importance of Davenport's film.

Davenport collaborated with the University of North Carolina Curriculum in Folklore and folklorist Daniel Patterson to direct and produce a series of documentaries on folklife in Appalachia and rural America, including Born for Hard Luck (1976), Being a Joines: A Life in the Brushy Mountains (1980), A Singing Stream: A Black Family Chronicle (1986), The Ballad of Frankie Silver (1998), and When My Work Is Over: The Life and Stories of Louise Anderson (1998). Davenport's collaboration with Patterson is discussed at length in Sharon R. Sherman's Documenting Ourselves: Film, Video, and Culture (1998).

In 2019, Davenport released his latest long form documentary "The Other Side of Eden: Stories of a Virginia Lynching".

=== Folkstreams ===
Davenport developed Folkstreams.net in 1999 as "A National Preserve of Documentary Films about American Roots Cultures." A non-profit organization, Folkstreams aims "to build a national preserve of hard-to-find documentary films about American folk or roots cultures.... [and] to give them renewed life by streaming them on the internet." The site features the work of independent filmmakers from the 1960s and later—including Alan Lomax, Pete Seeger, Les Blank, Davenport, and others—focusing on films that document and preserve the culture and folklife of various American regions and communities. Folkstreams also features explanatory material alongside the films, providing cultural, historical, and artistic context and significance as a means to educate the public. Davenport received a 2021 National Heritage Fellowship from the National Endowment for the Arts for his work developing Folkstreams.

== Awards and honors ==
In 2009, Davenport was the first scholar to receive the Archie Green Public Folklore Advocacy Award from the American Folklore Society in 2009. This award recognizes individuals "who have made significant contributions to the preservation and encouragement of folk traditions in the United States ... and [have] advanced the mission of public folklore." Davenport had previously received a Brown Hudson Award from the North Carolina Folklore Society in 1995 for his contributions to the study and preservation of North Carolina folk traditions.

Many of Davenport's films have received critical acclaim. The Shakers (1974) documentary received first prize at the American Film Festival, and his first feature-length film Willa: An American Snow White (1998) was awarded the 1998 Andrew Carnegie Award from the American Library Association for "Excellence in Children's Video." Soldier Jack, or The Man Who Caught Death in a Sack (1988) took first prize at the International Festival of Children's Films, the New York International Independent Film and Video Festival, the Chicago International Film Festival, and the American Film Institute's American Video Conference, among others.

Ashpet: An American Cinderella—perhaps Davenport's most lauded work, released in 1990—has garnered film awards at 18 regional, national, and international film festivals, including seven first-place prizes.

Davenport has received numerous grants for his work, including federal grants from the National Endowment for the Humanities, the National Endowment for the Arts, The Corporation for Public Broadcasting, the Institute of Museum and Library Services, along with state-level arts and humanities organizations.

He is a recipient of a 2021 National Heritage Fellowship awarded by the National Endowment for the Arts, which is the United States government's highest honor in the folk and traditional arts, for his work developing Folkstreams.net.

Davenport's collected papers from 1973-1995, along with archival footage from Folkstreams.net, are held in the Southern Folklife Collection at Louis Round Wilson Library, University of North Carolina-Chapel Hill. The collection includes materials documenting the making of Davenport's films, as well as production notes, transcripts, field notes, correspondence, posters and other publicity materials, audiotapes and cassettes, grant applications, and other items.

Davenport's still photographic collection from Taiwan in the 1960s is in the East Asian Collection of the University of California, C.V. Starr East Asian Library, UC Berkeley.

== Filmography ==
- 1970 T'ai Chi Ch'uan
- 1973 It Ain't City Music
- 1973 The Upperville Show
- 1974 The Shakers
- 1975 Thoughts on Fox Hunting
- 1976 Born for Hard Luck: Peg Leg Sam Jackson
- 1977 Hansel and Gretel: An Appalachian Version
- 1979 Rapunzel, Rapunzel
- 1980 The Frog King
- 1981 The Making of The Frog King
- 1981 Being a Joines: A Life in the Brushy Mountains
- 1982 Bristlelip
- 1982 Bearskin, or The Man Who Didn't Wash for Seven Years
- 1983 The Goose Girl
- 1983 Jack and the Dentist's Daughter
- 1986 A Singing Stream: A Black Family Chronicle
- 1988 Soldier Jack, or The Man Who Caught Death in a Sack
- 1990 Ashpet: An American Cinderella
- 1992 Mutzmag
- 1994 Blow the Tannery Whistle: A Western Carolina Story
- 1995 Making Grimm Movies
- 1996 The Ballad of Frankie Silver
- 1997 Thoughts on Beagling~
- 1998 Willa: An American Snow White
- 2000 Remembering Emmanuel Church
- 2000 When My Work is Over: The Life and Stories of Miss Louise Anderson, 1921-1994
- 2003 Remembering The High Lonesome
- 2008 Bodhidharma's Shoe
- 2012 Where Do They All Go?
- 2016 A Singing Stream: Reunion
- 2018 The Other Side of Eden: Stories of a Virginia Lynching
