= Folkstreams =

Nonprofit online media organization

Folkstreams is a non-profit online media organization that aims to collect and make available documentary films about folk art and culture, particularly in the United States.

It preserves and provides wide access to documentary films about the activities, voices, and experiences of members of America's diverse regional, ethnic, religious, and occupational cultures, often in the American South. The films show a variety of documentary approaches but commonly let the people themselves present their own circumstances, values, and arts.

Folkstreams was conceived and developed by filmmaker Tom Davenport in 1999. Encouraged by folklorist Dr. Daniel Patterson from the University of North Carolina at Chapel Hill, Davenport saw the importance of these films and knew from experience that their natural audiences had difficulty finding and seeing them. Many of the films are old, out of print, rare, and endangered. Others are obtainable only from little-known distributors. Their age and outdated formats, their non-standard lengths, the regional and ethnic speech of the people they feature, and their unusual subject matters had excluded many from the mainstream mass market television and cable broadcast opportunities in the last half of the 20th century.

As of mid 2023, Folkstreams includes over 425 documentaries dating back to 1947 including films by Les Blank, Alan Lomax, Bill Ferris, John Cohen, Jerome Hill, Errol Morris, Pete Seeger, Stan Woodward and Roberta Cantow. The goals of Folkstreams are to stream more such films and contextualize them with background essays and notes, to enlighten the audience about the importance of folklore and folklife in the lives of all people, and to encourage filmmakers to deposit copies of their work in archives for long-term preservation. About a half of the films are shown with background contextual information about the making of the film and the traditions presented. Most films on Folkstreams are protected by copyright, and the filmmakers have given their permission and encouragement for the streaming.

Folkstreams works with the National Film Preservation Foundation to identify and restore endangered 16mm films. Folkstreams made the website Video Aids to Film Preservation to help the public and conservators better understand the technology of film. The original Folkstreams database platform was created in 2002 by Steve Knoblock, and moved to a Craft CMS platform in 2020 with the help of Max Fenton.

In 2021 Tom Davenport received a National Heritage Fellowship award from the National Endowment for the Arts for his work developing Folkstreams.

== Notable films ==
- The High Lonesome Sound (1963, dir. John Cohen)
- Vernon, Florida (1981, dir. Errol Morris)
- Grandma Moses (1950, dir. Jerome Hill)
- Dry Wood (1973, dir. Les Blank & Maureen Gosling)
- Give My Poor Heart Ease (1975, dir. Bill Ferris)
- Born for Hard Luck: Peg Leg Sam Jackson (1976, dir. Tom Davenport)
- Style Wars (1983, dir. Tony Silver)
- To Hear Your Banjo Play (1947, dir. Irving Lerner & Willard Van Dyke)
- Well Known Stranger: Howard Finster's Workout (1987, dir. Hazen Robert Walker)
- The Land Where Blues Began (1979, dir. Alan Lomax)
- It's Grits (1980, dir. Stan Woodward)
- Clotheslines (1982, dir. Roberta Cantow)

== See also ==
- Film preservation
- Judy Peiser
- Journal of American Folklore
- Southern Folklife Collection
