= William R. Cotter (college president) =

American academic administrator (1936–2023)

18th President of Colby College
- In office 1979–2000
- Preceded by: Robert E. L. Strider
- Succeeded by: William Drea Adams

Personal details
- Born: March 9, 1936
- Died: March 9, 2023 (aged 87)
- Education: Harvard College, Harvard Law School

William R. Cotter (March 9, 1936 – March 9, 2023) was an American lawyer and the 18th president of Colby College from 1979 to 2000, the longest serving president in the college's history.

== Life ==
Cotter was the second son of a stay-at-home mother and a father who worked at a Chevrolet plant as a director of industrial relations, neither of whom had attended college. He graduated from Washington Irving High School in Tarrytown, N.Y. in 1954, magna cum laude from Harvard College in 1958, and cum laude from Harvard Law School in 1961.

== Early career ==
Cotter worked first as a law clerk to a federal district judge in the Southern District of New York, then as an assistant attorney general in Northern Nigeria under the MIT Fellows In Africa Program, and then as a law associate with Cahill Gordon & Reindel on Wall Street. Cotter served as one of the first White House fellows during the Johnson Administration. After finishing the fellowship in 1966, he became the representative of the Ford Foundation in Colombia and Venezuela, in which capacity he participated in programs to support economic planning, modern agriculture, the teaching of science, adult education on television, family planning, and the reform of legal education (including an exchange program with Harvard Law School). He returned to New York in 1970 to coordinate the foundation's educational programs before becoming the president of the African-American Institute (AAI) where he served for nine years. AAI provided graduate fellowships for African students to study at U.S. universities and held study tours and forums for African and U.S. leaders to exchange views. It also supported the education of leaders from the liberation groups in South Africa, Rhodesia (now Zimbabwe) and the then Portuguese and Belgian colonies in Africa.

Cotter and his wife, Linda, lived in Concord, Massachusetts, and spent the winter months in Longboat Key, Florida. They had three children and two granddaughters. Cotter died on March 9, 2023, during his 87th birthday.

== Presidency at Colby ==
Cotter was the longest-serving president at Colby, throughout his years also teaching Constitutional law in the Government Department. Under his leadership, the College increased its endowment from $23 million to $373 million (1979–2000), constructed or expanded more than 20 buildings, and added more than thirty endowed faculty chairs. He is well remembered for removing fraternities from campus; he is also prominently known for expanded efforts to increase diversity on campus in students and faculty. During his presidency the number of minority students increased from 64 (4 percent) in 1979 to 249 (14 percent) in 2000, and the number of minority tenure-track faculty members increased from four (3 percent) to 23 (16 percent). His time also saw record numbers of students participate in international study programs.

President Cotter and his wife Linda are remembered by the William R. Cotter Distinguished Teacher Professorship, the Linda K. Cotter Internship Fund and the William R. and Linda K. Cotter endowed debate fund. In 1997 trustees named the student center Cotter Union and he was elected a Life Trustee in 2000.

Following Colby, Cotter served from 2000–2006 as President of the Oak Foundation, an international grant-maker headquartered in Geneva Switzerland. He was (as of 2014) a consultant to the Robertson Foundation on their African Programs, treasurer of the Massachusetts Historical Society, and instructor on the Supreme Court at Pierian Springs Academy in Sarasota Florida.
