= John Agresto =

American author and lecturer

- Born: January 7, 1946 (age 80); Brooklyn, New York, U.S.
- Education: Boston College; Cornell University
- Occupations: Author; Lecturer; University Administrator

John Agresto (born January 7, 1946) is an American author, lecturer, and university administrator.

== Early life and education ==
Agresto was born on January 7, 1946, at the Navy Yard Hospital in Brooklyn, New York, to John and Theresa Agresto. He was raised in the Red Hook section of Brooklyn. After graduating from Brooklyn Prep, a Jesuit high school, Agresto went to college in Boston.

Agresto holds undergraduate degree from Boston College and a Ph.D. in government from Cornell University. He has published in the areas of politics, law, religion, literature, history, and education, and has taught at the University of Toronto, Kenyon College, Duke University and the New School University, and St. John's College in New Mexico where he also served as president from 1989 until 2000.

== Career ==
In the 1980s he served as associate director of the National Humanities Center in North Carolina's Research Triangle Park, reporting to director William J. Bennett. In 1982 he joined the National Endowment for the Humanities, serving as the Endowment's assistant chairman, and last, as acting chair for 15 months between the chairmanships of Bennett and Lynne Cheney.

In 1986 Agresto was nominated by President Ronald Reagan to become Archivist of the United States. His nomination led to charges of partisanship from both the left and right, with some questioning his resistance to using race-based affirmative action in the selection of reviewers, others opposing the appointment of a political scientist to a position generally reserved for archivists or professional historians. Ultimately, after declaring that he would release the Nixon tapes despite opposition from the Justice Department, the White House withdrew his nomination.

Soon after returning to the NEH, Agresto was elected to serve as President of St. John's College in Santa Fe, New Mexico, a position he held for 11 years. Defense Secretary Donald Rumsfeld's wife sat on St. John's board during his tenure.

In 2002 and 2003, he served as both professor and Lilly Senior Research Fellow at Wabash College in Indiana.

Between August 2003 and June 2004 he was asked to serve as a Coalition Provisional Authority Senior Advisor to the Ministry of Higher Education and Scientific Research in Baghdad, Iraq, charged with helping to rebuild all 22 of Iraq's university campuses, which had been looted and destroyed due to the American invasion. Agresto was offered the job despite having no experience in post-conflict resolution, nor any experience in the Middle East. During his tenure, Agresto requested $1 billion in reconstruction funds from the Bush administration but only received $8 million. In an interview with Rajiv Chandrasekaran for his book Imperial Life in the Emerald City, Agresto called himself a "neoconservative mugged by reality." Drawing on his experiences there, Agresto wrote Mugged By Reality – The Liberation of Iraq and the Failure of Good Intentions (Encounter, 2007).

Beginning in 2007, Agresto was asked to be a founding member of the Board of the American University of Iraq in Sulaimani. He subsequently also served in various administrative and academic positions (Academic Dean, Provost, Chancellor) from 2007 to 2008 and again in 2009 to 2010.

In 2008 and 2009 he was a visiting fellow at Princeton University's James Madison Program in American Ideals and Institutions. And, in 2013 and 2014, he was named Scholar Scholar-in- Residence at Hampton-Sidney College in Virginia. Upon his retirement from AUIS, Agresto was called upon to be both Member and Chair of the New Mexico State Advisory Committee to the U.S. Commission on Civil Rights (2010–16.) In 2017, upon the resignation of his predecessor, Agresto was appointed to serve as Probate Judge for Santa Fe County.

== Criticism ==
In 2009, the year Agresto was absent from AUIS, CounterPunch—a self-described “radical” and “muckraking journal”—ran an article by a former English instructor Mark Grueter who stated that The American University of Iraq – Sulaimani functioned more as a political tool than as an educational institution. According to the Article, a few faculty members and students had complained about mismanagement and incompetence at the university.

== Books ==
- Mugged By Reality – The Liberation of Iraq and the Failure of Good Intentions. Encounter Books, February 2007. It was featured on CSPAN's book TV on June 17, 2007.
- The Supreme Court and Constitutional Democracy, Cornell University Press, 1984. (Reprinted for overseas distribution by Prentice Hall of India, 1986, and Ferozsons Ltd., Pakistan, 1987. Also translated and published by the China University of Political Science and Law Press (CUPL Press) 2012.
- Liberty and Equality Under the Constitution, editor and contributor. The American Political Science Association and the American Historical Association, 1983.
- The Humanist as Citizen: Essays on the Uses of the Humanities, co-editor and contributor. The National Humanities Center, with UNC Press, 1982.
- Tomatoes, Basil, and Olive Oil – An Italian American Cookbook. Wolfsbrunnen Press, 2011.
- Rediscovering America, Asahina and Wallace, 2015

In addition, works by Agresto include various contributed book chapters as well as articles published in journals over the years in the fields of politics, culture, religion, and education. Many of his essays and op-eds have been carried by The New York Times, The Washington Post, The Wall Street Journal, Commentary Magazine, and The Chronicle of Higher Education.

== Professional associations ==
- Member, National Association of Scholars
- Member, Council of the National Alumni Forum

== Boards and commissions ==
- Member and Chair of the Academic Committee, Board of Trustees, The American University of Iraq in Sulaimani (2007–2010)
- Former Member, Board of Directors, The Ball Foundation, 1995–2001
- Former Member, Independent Commission on the Arts (Presidential Appointment)
- Former Commissioner, Columbian Quincentenary Commission (Ex officio)
- Board of Trustees of the Pontifical College Josephinum, 1990–1996
- Member, U.S. (Presidential) Delegation to Observe the Elections in Suriname, 1987

== Honorary degrees ==
- Kenyon College, Gambier, Ohio, 1989
- The Institute of World Politics, Washington, D.C., 2005
