= Bruce Cole =

American art historian

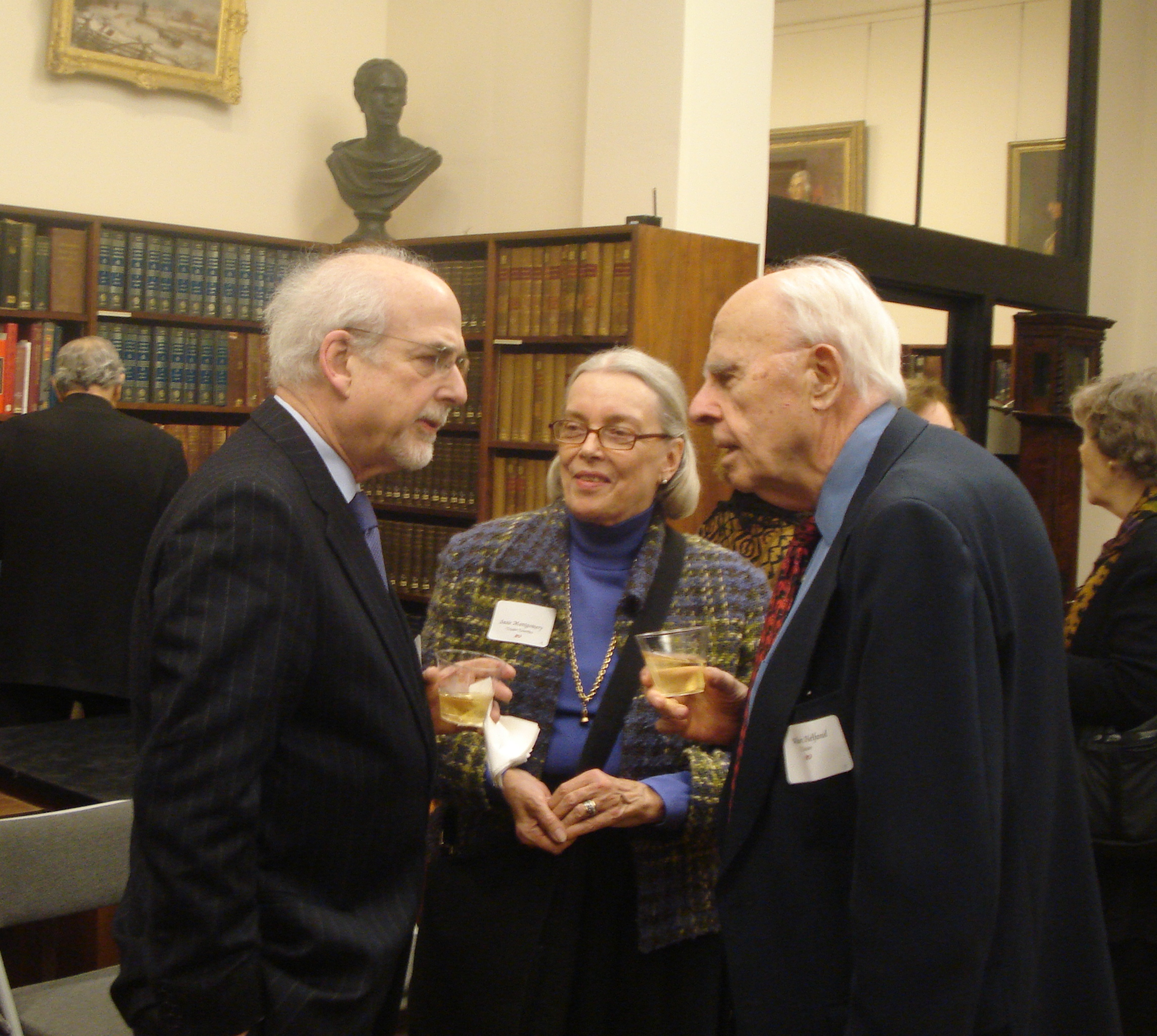
Cole (in left) with Susie Montgomery and Bill Helfand in November 2009

Bruce Milan Cole (August 2, 1938 – January 8, 2018) was a longtime professor of art history at Indiana University, a Senior Fellow at the Ethics and Public Policy Center in Washington, D.C., a member of the Eisenhower Memorial Commission, and the eighth Chair of the National Endowment for the Humanities.

== Early life and education ==
Bruce Cole was born on August 2, 1938, in Cleveland, Ohio to a salesman. He attended Western Reserve University (now Case Western Reserve University) from which he graduated in 1962. Cole earned his master's and doctorate degrees from Oberlin College and Bryn Mawr College in art history, in 1964 and 1969 respectively. In 1966, while attending University of Florence, Cole participated in the evacuation during Arno river flooding. He received nine honorary doctorate degrees.

== Career ==
=== Academic career ===
Before going to the NEH in December 2001, Cole taught at the University of Rochester and Indiana University in Bloomington, where he was a Distinguished Professor of Art History and Professor of Comparative Literature. In 2008, he received the university's President's Medal for "excellence in service, achievement and teaching." In 2006, Indiana Governor Mitch Daniels awarded Cole the Sagamore of the Wabash, which recognizes individuals who have brought distinction to the state of Indiana.

For two years, Cole was the William E. Suida Fellow at the Kunsthistorisches Institut in Florenz. Cole held fellowships and grants from the Guggenheim Foundation, the American Council of Learned Societies, the Kress Foundation, the American Philosophical Society, and the UCLA Center for Medieval and Renaissance Studies. He was a corresponding member of the Accademia Senese degli Intronati, the oldest learned society in Europe, and a founder and former co-president of the Association for Art History. He has written 15 books and numerous articles.

=== NEH Chair ===
Cole's connection with the National Endowment for the Humanities began when, like thousands of others, he received an NEH fellowship. He subsequently served as peer-reviewer for NEH applications, and later as a member of the National Council on the Humanities.

From 2001 to 2009, Cole served as the eighth chair of the National Endowment for the Humanities (NEH). Cole was nominated twice by President George W. Bush and confirmed by the Senate in 2001 and for a second term in 2005. Cole promoted some key initiatives at the Endowment, including We the People, a program designed to encourage the teaching, study, and understanding of American history and culture, and Picturing America, which used great American art to teach the nation's history and culture in 80,000 schools and public libraries nationwide. Cole also encouraged the expansion of support for digital projects by NEH, including grants specified for "digital humanities." Additionally, under his tenure, the NEH developed partnerships with several foreign countries, including Mexico and China.

=== After NEH ===
After leaving the NEH, Cole served as president and CEO of the Museum of the American Revolution in Valley Forge, Pennsylvania, until 2011.

In August 2013, President Obama appointed Cole to the Eisenhower Memorial Commission, which was tasked with overseeing the creation of the National Dwight D. Eisenhower Memorial. Cole had previously criticized the selected design by Frank Gehry in articles and congressional testimony. Cole served on the board of advisors for the National Civic Art Society, which supports classical architecture and remained a critic of Gehry's memorial design.

== Personal life and death ==
Cole and his wife Doreen (née Luff) lived in Virginia and had a son, Ryan and a daughter, Stephanie Whittaker. Cole died in Cancún, Mexico on January 8, 2018.

== Boards and honors ==
Cole served on many boards, including American Heritage Society, the Jack Miller Center, the Villa Firenze Foundation, and the National Civic Art Society. In 2010, Cole was appointed by Governor Mitch Daniels to Indiana University's board of trustees. Previously, Cole served on the U.S. National Commission for the United Nations Educational, Scientific, and Cultural Organization (UNESCO), the board of the Woodrow Wilson Center, and held a Senate-appointed position on the National Advisory Committee on Institutional Quality and Integrity.

In November 2008, President Bush awarded Cole the Presidential Citizens Medal "for his work to strengthen our national memory and ensure that our country's heritage is passed on to future generations." The medal is one of the highest honors the president can confer upon a civilian, second only to the Presidential Medal of Freedom. Earlier in 2008, Cole was decorated as a Knight of the Grand Cross, the highest honor in the Republic of Italy.

== Selected written works ==
- Giotto and Florentine Painting, 1280-1375. New York: Harper & Row, 1976.
- Agnolo Gaddi. Oxford: Clarendon Press, 1977.
- Masaccio and the Art of Early Renaissance Florence. Bloomington: Indiana University Press, 1980.
- Sienese Painting: From Its Origins to the Fifteenth Century. New York: Harper & Row, 1980.
- The Renaissance Artist at Work: From Pisano to Titian. New York: Harper & Row, 1983.
- Sienese Painting in the Age of the Renaissance. Bloomington: Indiana University Press, 1985.
- Italian Art, 1250–1550: The Relation of Renaissance Art to Life and Society. New York: Harper & Row, 1987.
- Art of the Western World: From Ancient Greece to Post-Modernism. New York: Simon & Schuster, 1989.
- Piero della Francesca: Tradition and Innovation in Renaissance Art. New York: Icon Editions, 1991.
- Giotto: the Scrovegni Chapel, Padua. New York: George Braziller, 1993.
- Studies in the History of Italian Art 1250–1550. London: Pindar Press, 1996.
- Titian and Venetian Paintings, 1450–1590. Boulder: Westview Press, 1999.
- The Informed Eye: Understanding Masterpieces of Western Art. Chicago: Ivan R. Dee, 1999.
- Art from the Swamp: How Washington Bureaucrats Squander Millions on Awful Art. New York: Encounter Books, 2018 (published posthumously).

Government offices
Preceded by William R. Ferris	Chairperson of the National Endowment for the Humanities; 2001–2009	Succeeded by Jim Leach
