= Grey Ferris =

American politician (1946–2008)

Member of the Mississippi State Senate
- In office January 7, 1992 – January 4, 2000
- Preceded by: Ken Harper
- Succeeded by: Mike Chaney
- Constituency: 24th district (1992–1993); 23rd district (1993–2000)

Personal details
- Born: Grey Flowers Ferris; May 31, 1946 Vicksburg, Mississippi, U.S.
- Died: June 13, 2008 (aged 62) Vicksburg, Mississippi, U.S.
- Party: Democratic
- Spouse: Jann Terral (m. 1970)
- Relatives: William R. Ferris (brother)
- Education: Tulane University (BA, JD)

Grey Flowers Ferris (May 31, 1946 – June 13, 2008) was an American lawyer, farmer, and politician who served two terms as a member of the Mississippi State Senate. He got his start by successfully running for student government president while an undergraduate at Tulane University and later attended the Tulane University Law School. Rising to chairman of the Senate's Education Committee, he ran for lieutenant governor in 1999 but lost in the Democratic primary to former state senator Amy Tuck. In 2009, Governor Haley Barbour signed a bill passed by the state legislature to name the Mississippi Board of Education's meeting room in Jackson after Ferris.

Ferris married the former Jann Terral, an artist, in New Orleans on June 6, 1970.
