= Sisters (Lynne Cheney novel) =

1981 novel by Lynne Cheney

- Cover of Sisters
- Author: Lynne Cheney
- Language: English
- Genre: Historical novel
- Publisher: Signet Books
- Publication date: November 1981
- Publication place: United States
- Media type: Print (Paperback)
- ISBN: 0-451-11204-0 (first edition, paperback)
- OCLC: 8043437

Sisters is a 1981 novel by Lynne Cheney published only in a Signet Canadian paperback edition as part of the New American Library (ISBN 0-451-11204-0). Sisters is a historical novel set in Cheyenne, Wyoming in 1886. Sophie Dymond, a magazine editor in New York City, comes home to Cheyenne after the death of her sister, Helen. The novel is a historical and literary portrayal of the status of women in the Old West. In the novel, Sophie finds a letter that Amy Travers, a schoolteacher and close friend of Helen's, had written to her:

Helen, my joy and my beloved,

Why do we stay? I have no reason beyond a few pupils who would miss me briefly, and your life would be infinitely better away from him. Let us go away together, away from the anger and imperatives of men. We shall find ourselves a secluded bower where they dare not venture. There will be only the two of us, and we shall linger through long afternoons of sweet retirement. In the evenings I shall read to you while you work your cross-stitch in the firelight. And then we shall go to bed, our bed, my dearest girl. . . .

The "him" referred to in the letter is apparently Helen's husband, James Stevenson. Later in the book, the author writes of Sophie's impressions on seeing Amy Travers and another woman, Lydia Swerdlow, with their arms around each other:

The women who embraced in the wagon were Adam and Eve on a dark cathedral stage--no, Eve and Eve, loving one another as they would not be able to once they ate of the fruit and knew themselves as they truly were. She felt curiously moved, curiously envious of them. . . . she saw that the women in the cart had a passionate, loving intimacy forever closed to her. How strong it made them. What comfort it gave.

== Legacy ==
In a February 9, 2005 interview on NPR with Terry Gross, Cheney denied that Sisters contained a lesbian relationship. Cheney suggested that the relationship between the two characters was in question and a historical mystery. She also suggested that Sisters was her one bad book, written in an "attempt to take the novel Rebecca (by Daphne du Maurier) and put it in a Western setting."

In an interview that took place on October 27, 2006 with Wolf Blitzer on CNN's The Situation Room, Cheney denied that Sisters contained rape or graphic depictions of lesbian sex.

Sisters and Saddam Hussein's novel Zabibah and the King are the subject of Taylor Mac's satirical song The Palace of the End.
