= Judy Peiser =

American filmmaker

Judy Peiser (born June 4, 1945) is a filmmaker as well as co-founder and executive director of the Center for Southern Folklore in Memphis, Tennessee, United States. She graduated with a bachelor of arts degree from the University of Illinois and a master's degree from the University of Memphis.

Peiser founded the Center for Southern Folklore in 1972 along with William Ferris.

Peiser has produced and edited documentary films including Fannie Bell Chapman: Gospel Singer, Gravel Springs Fife and Drum, and Ray Lum: Mule Trader, available on the Folkstreams project's website. In interviews she has cited a desire to meet and understand different people as one of the main motivators for her work.

She is heavily involved in the Memphis Jewish community and often speaks of her faith.

She was a member of the board of directors of the North American Folk Alliance.

== Filmography ==
- Mississippi Delta Blues 1974
- Fannie Bell Chapman: Gospel Singer
- Gravel Springs Fife and Drum
- Ray Lum: Mule Trader
