= Jon Parrish Peede =

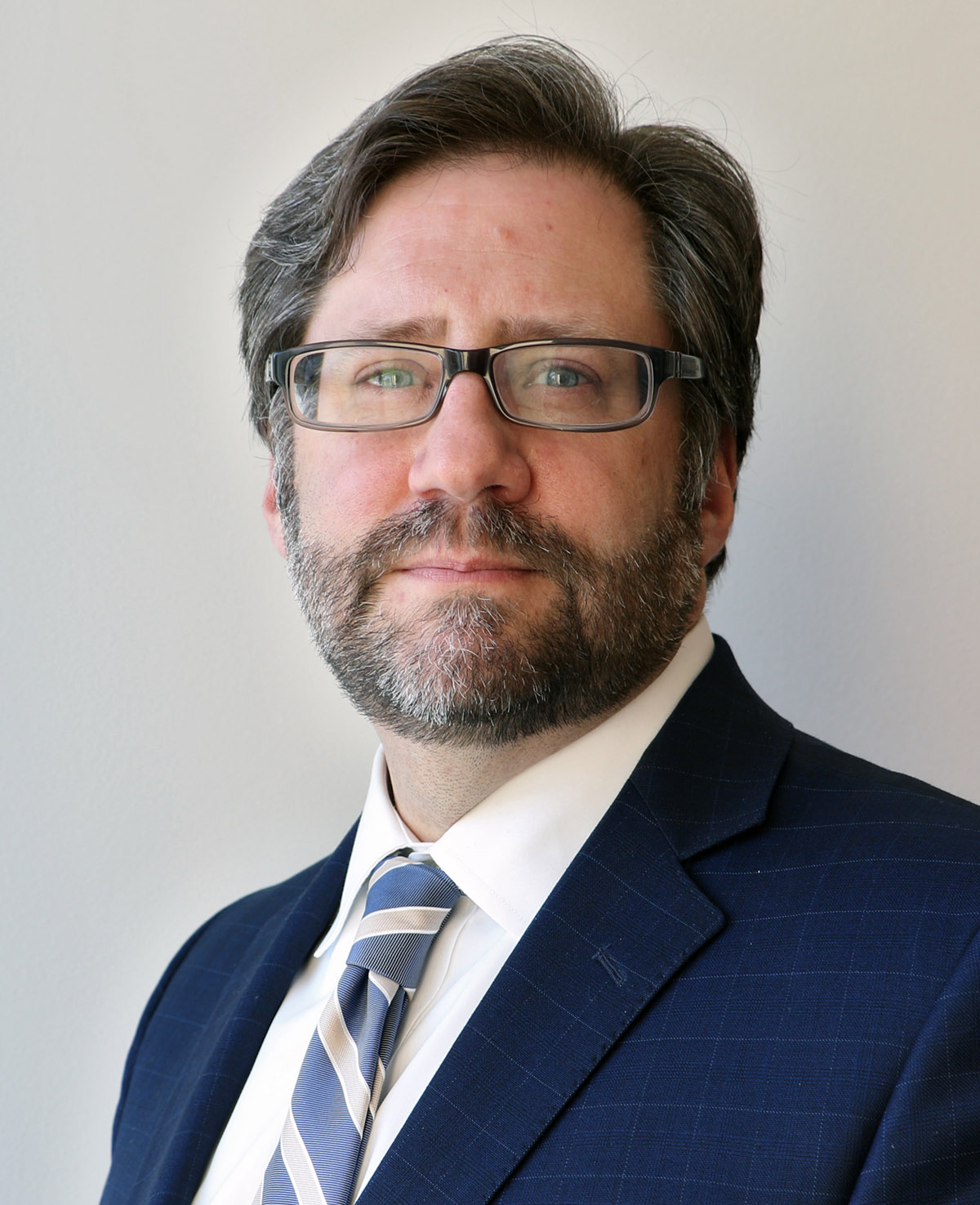

Chair of the National Endowment for the Humanities
- In office May 3, 2018 – January 20, 2021
- President: Donald Trump
- Preceded by: William Drea Adams
- Succeeded by: Adam Wolfson (acting)

Personal details
- Born: Mississippi, U.S.
- Education: Vanderbilt University; University of Mississippi

Jon Parrish Peede is an American book editor and literary review publisher, who served as the chairman of the National Endowment for the Humanities from 2018 to 2021.

== Early life ==
Jon Parrish Peede was born in Mississippi, and he grew up in Brandon, Mississippi. His father was Dr Robert Louis Peede Sr and his mother, Mary Ann Parrish. He has three brothers.

Peede graduated from Vanderbilt University, where he earned a bachelor's degree in English. He attended the University of Mississippi, where one of his professors was William R. Ferris, and he earned a master's degree in Southern Studies. Peede and Ferris both served as chairman of the National Endowment for the Humanities.

== Career ==
Peede was a book editor for the Mercer University Press from 1994 to 1996. He served as director of publications and later director of communications at Millsaps College from 1997 to 2003. He worked for the National Endowment for the Arts in senior roles from 2003 to 2011, including four years as director of literature grants. He was the publisher of the Virginia Quarterly Review at the University of Virginia from 2011 to 2016.

When William Drea Adams resigned as the chairman of the National Endowment for the Humanities in May 2017, Peede became "the Trump administration’s new liaison to the N.E.H.". As acting chair in October 2017, he acknowledged that President Donald Trump wanted to eliminate the agency or at least reduce the budget. In March 2018, Peede was nominated by President Trump to become the new chair of the NEH. He was confirmed in April 2018. With bipartisan support in Congress, the agency budget dramatically increased during Peede's tenure from $147.9 million to $167.5 million. He also oversaw the federal agency's awarding of $75 million in CARES Act funding in direct grants and through state humanities council partnerships.

In January 2021, Peede resigned as the head of the federal agency. In a press release, the NEH credited him with creating a new category of grants to support infrastructure and capacity-building at humanities institutions, awarding emergency grants for cultural organizations affected by natural disasters, funding a partnership with the First Nations Development Institute to support the revitalization of Native American languages, and creating the "A More Perfect Union" grant program to commemorate the 250th anniversary of the founding of the United States in 2026.

Peede is a frequent advocate for improved K–12 teaching of U.S. history and civic education, and he awarded funding to create the Educating for American Democracy initiative that included 300 higher education and nonprofit partners and scholars. In partnership with the Teagle Foundation under the leadership of Andrew Delbanco, Peede provided NEH funding to support faculty salaries and programmatic expenses for undergraduate general education programs that include classics as well as contemporary literary works by authors of diverse backgrounds.

Peede is the co-editor of a collection of essays about Flannery O'Connor. He has written for numerous journals, magazines, and other publications, often on Southern culture.

His awards include an honorary degree from Manchester Community College in New Hampshire in 2019 and the President’s Medal of Distinction from California State University, Fresno in 2019.

On March 27, 2024, Peede was selected as the 31st President of Ashland University. He began his role on June 1, 2024.

== Personal life ==
Peede has a wife and a daughter.

== Works ==
- McMullen, Joanne Halleran; Peede, Jon Parrish, eds. (2007). Inside the Church of Flannery O'Connor: Sacrament, Sacramental, and the Sacred in Her Fiction. Macon, Georgia: Mercer University Press. ISBN 9780881460551. OCLC 301226088.
