= Lynne Cheney =

Second Lady of the United States from 2001 to 2009

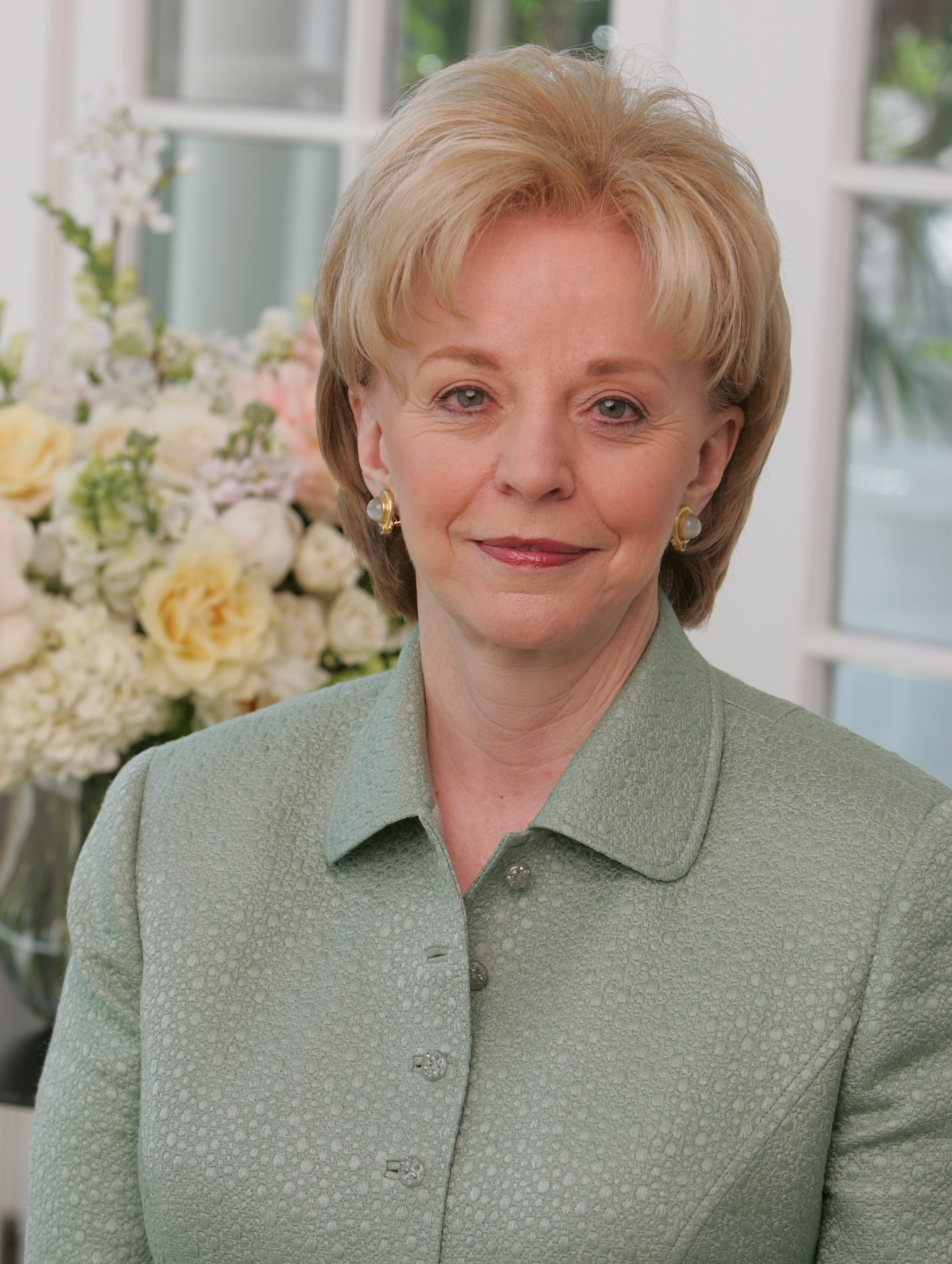
- Official portrait, 2005

Second Lady of the United States
- In role January 20, 2001 – January 20, 2009
- Vice President: Dick Cheney
- Preceded by: Tipper Gore
- Succeeded by: Jill Biden

Chair of the National Endowment for the Humanities
- In office May 21, 1986 – January 20, 1993
- President: Ronald Reagan; George H. W. Bush
- Preceded by: John Agresto (acting)
- Succeeded by: Sheldon Hackney

Personal details
- Born: Lynne Ann Vincent; August 14, 1941 (age 85) Casper, Wyoming, U.S.
- Party: Republican
- Spouse: Dick Cheney (m. 1964; died 2025)
- Children: Liz; Mary
- Education: Colorado College (BA); University of Colorado, Boulder (MA); University of Wisconsin, Madison (PhD)

Lynne Ann Cheney (/ˈtʃeɪni/ CHAY-nee; née Vincent; born August 14, 1941) is an American author, scholar, former talk show host, and the widow of Dick Cheney, the 46th vice president of the United States. She served as the second lady of the United States from 2001 to 2009 when her husband was vice president.

Cheney served as Chair of the National Endowment for the Humanities under President Ronald Reagan and George H. W. Bush from 1986 until 1993.

== Early life and education ==
Lynne Ann Vincent was born on August 14, 1941, in Casper, Wyoming. Her mother, Edna Lolita (née Lybyer, 1919–1973), became a deputy sheriff, and her father, Wayne Edwin Vincent (1915-1976), was an engineer. A descendant of Mormon pioneers, and with ancestral roots in Denmark, Sweden, England, Ireland, and Wales, she was raised Presbyterian and became Methodist upon her marriage to Dick Cheney.

Cheney received her Bachelor of Arts degree in English literature with highest honors from Colorado College. She continued her education with a Master of Arts degree from the University of Colorado Boulder, and a PhD in 19th-century British literature from the University of Wisconsin–Madison. Her dissertation was entitled "Matthew Arnold's Possible Perfection: A Study of the Kantian Strain in Arnold's Poetry".

== Career ==
Cheney served as the sixth chair of the National Endowment for the Humanities (NEH) from 1986 to 1993. In 1995, she founded the American Council of Trustees and Alumni, a think tank devoted to reforming higher education.

She is a senior fellow in education and culture at the American Enterprise Institute for Public Policy Research. She also serves as a director of Reader's Digest Association, Inc. From 1995 to 1998, Cheney served as the co-host of the Sunday edition of CNN's Crossfire, replacing Tony Snow.

Cheney served on Lockheed Corporation's board of directors from 1994 to 2001. She gave up the $120,000-a-year position shortly before her husband's inauguration. She had served on the Lockheed board's finance, and nominating and corporate governance committees.

In 2000, she was mentioned as a possible conservative female pick as Republican vice presidential nominee with George W. Bush. The appointed head of the nominating committee was her husband, Dick Cheney, then the CEO of Halliburton, whom Bush eventually chose as his running mate.

=== National history standards ===
In the early 1990s when heading the NEH, Cheney advocated voluntary national history standards for the nation's high school students and announced plans to create them. In 1994 shortly before the standards were to be released, Cheney, who was aghast at the results, wrote an opinion for The Wall Street Journal she titled The End of History, where she "set off a firestorm," according to Gary B. Nash who headed the standards effort. She found the new history standards to be insufficiently "celebratory". Cheney followed with another opinion, The End of History, Part II in 2015. As of the early 2020s, her reversal is still cited in the discussion and controversy surrounding The 1619 Project.

== Second Lady of the United States (2001–2009) ==
During her husband's first national campaign, Cheney spoke as the spouse of the vice presidential nominee at the 2000 Republican National Convention.

As second lady, Cheney repeatedly spoke out against violent and sexually explicit lyrics in popular music, including those of rapper Eminem, picking up on an issue that was originally made famous by former vice president Al Gore and his wife Tipper. She also criticized video game developers for similar content.

On an October 10, 2007, episode of The Daily Show, Cheney stated her opposition to a constitutional amendment banning same-sex marriage. Her daughter Mary is a lesbian and both Lynne Cheney and her husband Dick publicly supported same-sex marriage during and after his vice presidency.

== Subsequent activities (2009–present) ==
Up to a June 2007 application deadline for interim appointment, and leading up to the 2008 special election, Cheney was considered a possible contender to complete the term of Craig L. Thomas as U.S. senator from Wyoming following his death in 2007. Cheney acknowledged in a 2015 interview that she had considered running for the senate seat.

== Personal life ==
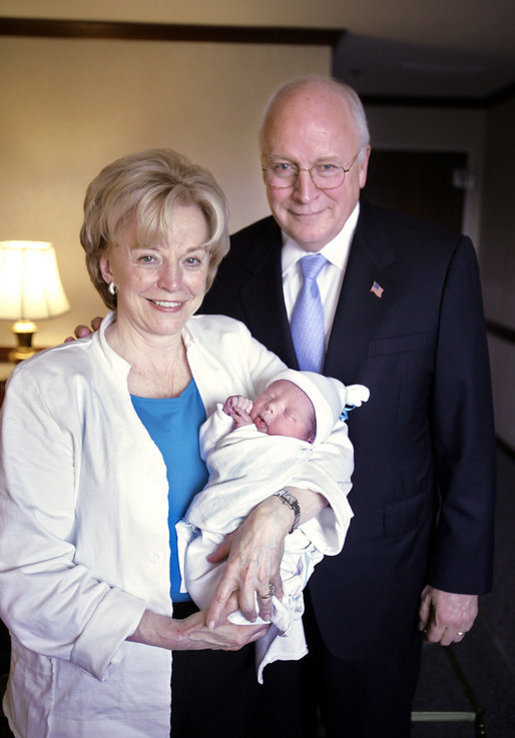
Cheney with her husband, Dick Cheney with their newborn grandchild in 2006

Lynne Cheney married Dick Cheney in 1964, and remained married until his death on November 3, 2025, from complications of pneumonia and cardiovascular disease. They have two daughters, Elizabeth Cheney (born July 28, 1966), and Mary Cheney (born on March 14, 1969), as well as seven grandchildren.

== In popular culture ==
Cheney criticized Eminem in September 2000 for his promotion of "violence of the most degrading kind against women", in response to which he mockingly referenced Lynne and Dick Cheney (and his recurring heart problems) in the 2002 song "Without Me". Cheney was portrayed by Amy Adams in the 2018 film Vice, a biopic about Dick Cheney. In this political satire, she is portrayed as a sly driving force and a source of inspiration and support behind her husband's political career.

== Books ==
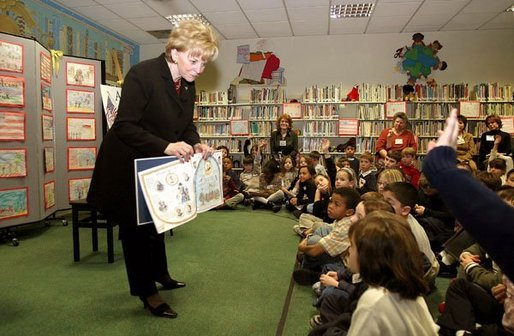
Cheney giving a public reading from her book America: A Patriotic Primer to the students of Vicenza Elementary School in Vicenza, Italy (2004)

Lynne Cheney is the author or co-author of several books.

=== Fiction ===
- Executive Privilege: A Washington Novel (1979) (ISBN 978-0-671-24060-8)
- Sisters (1981). New American Library (now part of Penguin Random House). (ISBN 978-0-451-11204-0)
- The Body Politic: A Novel (2000), co-authored with Victor Gold (ISBN 978-0-312-97963-8)

=== Non-fiction ===
- Kings of the Hill: Power and Personality in the House of Representatives (1983), co-authored with husband Dick Cheney. New York City: Continuum. (ISBN 978-0-8264-0230-1)
- American Memory: A Report on the Humanities in the Nation's Public Schools (1987) (ISBN 978-0-16-004284-3)
- Academic Freedom (1992) (ISBN 978-1-878802-13-2)
- Telling the Truth: Why Our Country and Our Culture Have Stopped Making Sense—and What We Can Do About It (1995) (ISBN 978-0-684-82534-2)
- Kings of the Hill: How Nine Powerful Men Changed the Course of American History (1996), co-authored with Dick Cheney. Revised edition of Kings of the Hill published in 1983 by Continuum. The major difference is an added chapter on Speaker of the House Newt Gingrich. New York City: Touchstone/Simon & Schuster (ISBN 978-0-684-82340-9)
- America: A Patriotic Primer (2002) (ISBN 978-0-689-85192-6)
- A is for Abigail: An Almanac of Amazing American Women (2003) (ISBN 978-0-689-85819-2)
- When Washington Crossed the Delaware: A Wintertime Story for Young Patriots (2004) (ISBN 978-0-689-87043-9)
- A Time for Freedom: What Happened When in America (2005) (ISBN 978-1-4169-0925-5)
- Our 50 States: A Family Adventure Across America (2006) (ISBN 978-0-689-86717-0)
- Blue Skies, No Fences: A Memoir of Childhood and Family (2007) (ISBN 978-1-4165-3288-0)
- We the People: The Story of Our Constitution (2008) (ISBN 978-1-4169-5418-7)
- James Madison: A Life Reconsidered (2014) (ISBN 978-0-670-02519-0)
- The Virginia Dynasty: Four Presidents and the Creation of the American Nation (2020) (ISBN 978-1-101-98004-0)

Government offices
Preceded by John Agresto; Acting	Chair of the National Endowment for the Humanities; 1986–1993	Succeeded by Jerry Martin; Acting
Honorary titles
Preceded by Tipper Gore	Second Lady of the United States; 2001–2009	Succeeded by Jill Biden
U.S. order of precedence (ceremonial)
Preceded by Al Gore as Former Vice President	Order of precedence of the United States as widowed former Second Lady	Succeeded by Mike Pence as Former Vice President
