= William R. Ferris =

American folklorist and scholar

- Born: William Reynolds Ferris Jr. February 5, 1942 (age 84); Vicksburg, Mississippi, U.S.
- Occupations: Author; professor; documentatarian
- Spouse: Marcie Cohen
- Relatives: Grey Ferris (brother)
- Awards: Dartmouth Medal (1990); Charles Frankel Prize (1995); Ordre des Arts et des Lettres; Chevalier (1985); Officier (1996); Grammy Award (2018); Blues Hall of Fame (2024)

Academic background
- Education: Davidson College (BA); Northwestern University (MA); University of Pennsylvania (MA, PhD)
- Thesis: Black Folklore from the Mississippi Delta (1969)

Academic work
- Discipline: History; literature; folklore
- Institutions: Jackson State University; Yale University; University of Mississippi; University of North Carolina

Dr. William Reynolds Ferris Jr. (born February 5, 1942), also known as Bill Ferris, is an American folklorist, scholar, author, filmmaker and ethnomusicologist focused on the distinct cultural qualities of the American South. He is a former chairman of the National Endowment for the Humanities and, with Judy Peiser, he co-founded the Center for Southern Folklore in Memphis, Tennessee. He was the founding director of the Center for the Study of Southern Culture at the University of Mississippi, and is co-editor of The Encyclopedia of Southern Culture.

== Background ==
William R. Ferris was born 5 February 1942 in Vicksburg, Mississippi, United States. He attended public school in Vicksburg until high school, when he was accepted to Brooks School in North Andover, Mass. Ferris got his B.A. in English Literature at Davidson College in 1964, and an M.A. in English Literature from Northwestern University in 1965. He attended Trinity College in Dublin, Ireland, for one year from 1965 to 1966, and returned to the U.S. to continue his graduate studies. In 1967, he received a Master's and, in 1969, a Ph.D. in folklore from the University of Pennsylvania.

== Early career ==
Ferris's scholarship has focused on Southern African American folklore and culture, through a variety of media: print, sound, film, and photography. From 1970 to 1972, he was an assistant professor in the Department of English at Jackson State University in Mississippi. From 1972 to 1979, he was an associate professor in the American and Afro-American Studies Programs at Yale University. During his tenure at Yale, Ferris co-founded the Center for Southern Folklore in Mississippi, and was its director from 1972 to 1984. Ferris returned to the South, and, from 1979 to 1997, he was the founding director of the Center for the Study of Southern Culture and a professor of anthropology at the University of Mississippi in Oxford. While there, he established several annual conferences, including the Faulkner and Yoknapatawpha Conference.

== National Endowment for the Humanities ==
President Bill Clinton nominated Ferris to be the seventh Chair of the National Endowment for the Humanities (NEH) in 1997, a post Ferris held through 2001.

=== Clinton controversy ===
Ferris was the subject of some controversy in 2000 when the National Council on the Humanities, the NEH's advisory board, selected President Clinton for the Jefferson Lecture, which the NEH describes as "the highest honor the federal government confers for distinguished intellectual achievement in the humanities." The Jefferson Lecture honor had never been given to an elected official before; Ferris said that his intent was to establish a new tradition for every President to deliver a Jefferson Lecture during his or her presidency, and that this was consistent with the NEH's broader efforts under his leadership to increase public awareness of the humanities. However, some scholars and political opponents objected that the choice of Clinton represented an inappropriate and unprecedented politicization of the NEH. William J. Bennett, a conservative Republican and former chairman of the NEH under President Reagan, charged that the proposal was an example of how Clinton had "corrupted all of those around him." In the wake of the controversy, President Clinton declined the honor; a White House spokesperson said the President "didn't want the work of the National Endowment for the Humanities to be called into question."

Despite this controversy, and even after the 2000 presidential election replaced Clinton with Republican George W. Bush, Ferris retained the strong support of Mississippi's two Republican senators, Trent Lott and Thad Cochran. They stressed Ferris's efforts during his tenure at NEH to reduce the ideological battles that had troubled the NEH under prior administrations, as well as his popularity among the state humanities leaders, and they publicly asked President Bush to retain Ferris. However, Bush ultimately decided to replace Ferris with his own appointee, Bruce Cole.

== Later career and UNC ==
In 2002, Ferris was a Visiting Public Policy Scholar at the Woodrow Wilson International Center for Scholars and joined the faculty at the University of North Carolina at Chapel Hill as the Senior Associate Director of the Center for the Study of the American South, professor of history, and adjunct professor in the Curriculum in Folklore. He currently teaches two seminars a year: "Southern Music" and "Southern Literature and the Oral Tradition".

== Writing and lectures ==
Ferris has traveled and lectured extensively throughout Europe and the U.S. He is the author of ten books, including You Live and Learn. Then You Die and Forget It All: Ray Lum's Tales of Horses, Mules and Men, and co-editor of the Encyclopedia of Southern Culture. His most recent book, The South in Color: A Visual Journal, was published in September 2016, by UNC Press. He has written fiction, poetry, and numerous articles on folklore and literature, as well as book, record, and film reviews. Ferris has recorded blues albums, produced 15 documentary films on southern folklore, and, for ten years, hosted the weekly Mississippi Public Radio blues show, Highway 61. Ferris's photography, documenting aspects of African American southern folklore, has been featured nationally, including in an exhibit by the Smithsonian Museum and an article by the New York Times.

The William R. Ferris Collection is located in the Southern Folklife Collection of the Wilson Library of the University of North Carolina at Chapel Hill.

== Filmography ==
- Gravel Springs Fife and Drum (1972, co-directed by Judy Peiser and David Evans)
- Ray Lum (1972)
- Black Delta Religion (1972)
- Mississippi Delta Blues (1974)
- Give My Poor Heart Ease (1975)
- Made In Mississippi (1975, co-directed by Judy Peiser)
- I Ain't Lying (1975)
- Fannie Bell Chapman: Gospel Singer (1975, co-directed by Judy Peiser and Bobby Taylor)
- Two Black Churches (1975)
- Hush Hoggies Hush: Tom Johnson's Praying Pigs (1978, co-directed by Judy Peiser)
- Bottle Up and Go (1980)

== Honors and awards ==
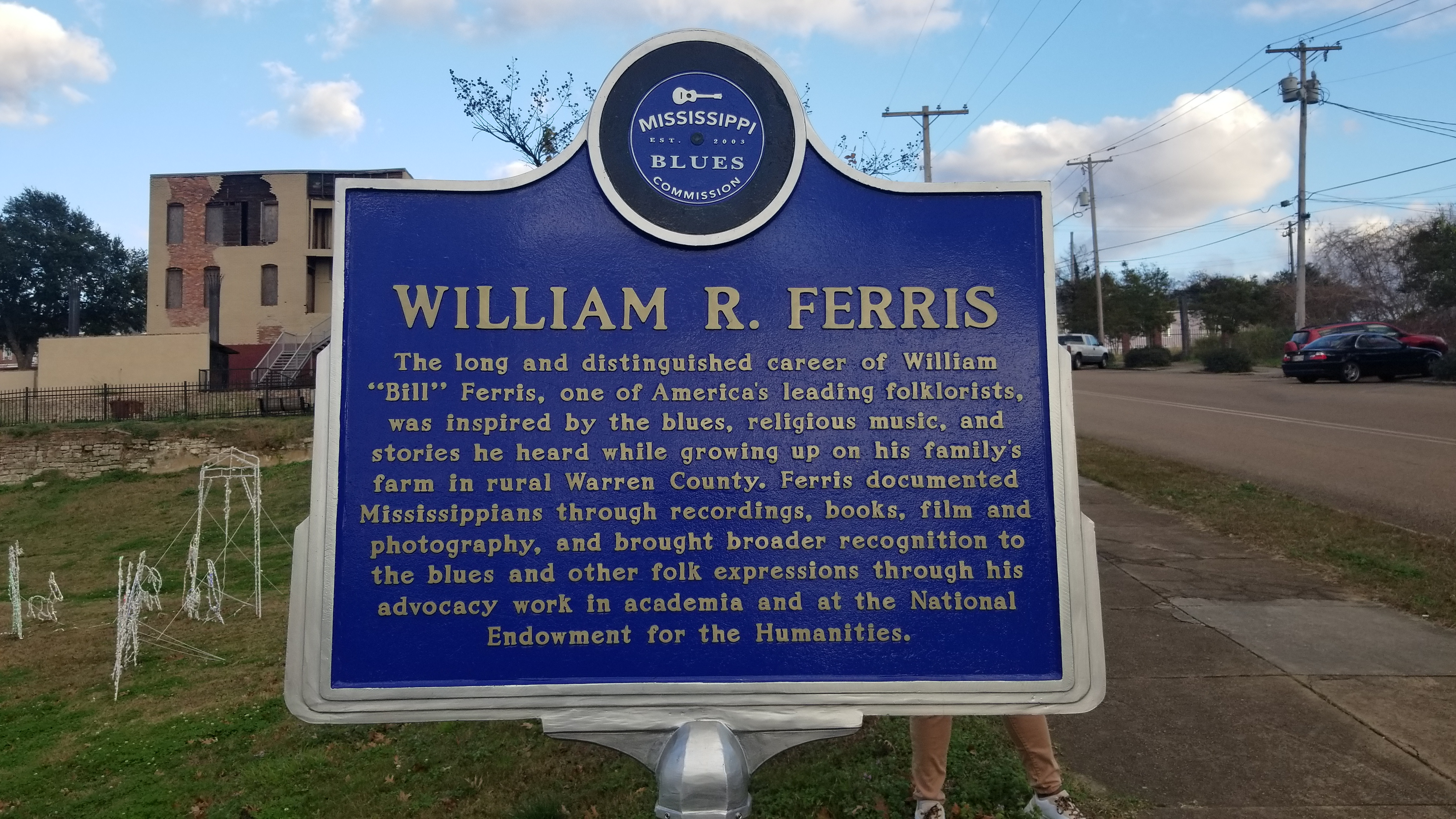
The Mississippi Blues Trail Marker recognizing Ferris in Vicksburg, Mississippi

Ferris is the recipient of numerous awards, including the Charles Frankel Prize in the Humanities, bestowed by President Clinton, and France's Chevalier and Officer in the Order of Arts and Letters. He has been honored by the Blues Hall of Fame, which recognized his book Blues from the Delta as one of the "Classics of Blues Literature." He was also honored with a marker on the Mississippi Blues Trail in Vicksburg. In 2019, Ferris received a Grammy Award for Best Historical Album for the boxed set Voices of Mississippi: Artists and Musicians Documented by William Ferris.

== Personal life ==
Ferris has four siblings. His brother, Grey, was a senator in the Mississippi State Legislature from 1992 to 2001, and died from cancer in June 2008. Ferris is married to Marcie Cohen Ferris and has a daughter named Virginia.

Government offices
Preceded by Sheldon Hackney	Chairperson of the National Endowment for the Humanities; 1997–2001	Succeeded by Bruce Cole
