= Jim Leach =

American politician and academic (1942–2024)

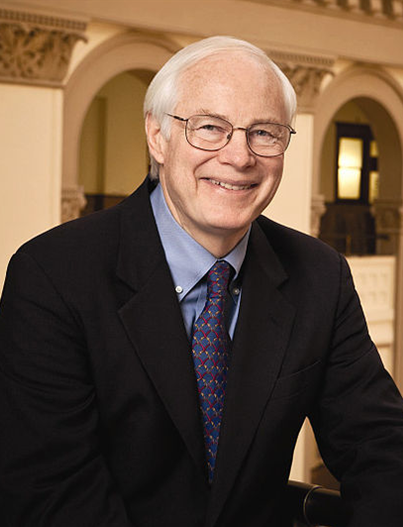

Chair of the National Endowment for the Humanities
- In office August 7, 2009 – April 23, 2013
- President: Barack Obama
- Preceded by: Carole Watson (acting)
- Succeeded by: Carole Watson (acting)

Chair of the House Financial Services Committee
- In office January 4, 1995 – January 3, 2001
- Preceded by: Henry B. Gonzalez
- Succeeded by: Mike Oxley

Member of the U.S. House of Representatives from Iowa
- In office January 3, 1977 – January 3, 2007
- Preceded by: Edward Mezvinsky
- Succeeded by: Dave Loebsack
- Constituency: 1st district (1977–2003); 2nd district (2003–2007)

Personal details
- Born: James Albert Smith Leach; October 15, 1942 Davenport, Iowa, U.S.
- Died: December 11, 2024 (aged 82) Iowa City, Iowa, U.S.
- Party: Republican (before 2022); Democratic (2022–2024)
- Spouse: Deba Leach
- Education: Princeton University (AB); Johns Hopkins University (MA)
- Jim Leach's voice Leach, as chair of the House Financial Services Committee, closes debate on the Gramm–Leach–Bliley Act; Recorded November 4, 1999

James Albert Smith Leach (October 15, 1942 – December 11, 2024) was an American academic and politician. He served as ninth Chair of the National Endowment for the Humanities from 2009 to 2013 and was a member of the U.S. House of Representatives from Iowa (1977–2007).

Leach was the John L. Weinberg Visiting Professor of Public and International Affairs at the Woodrow Wilson School of Princeton University. He also served as the interim director of the Institute of Politics at Harvard Kennedy School at Harvard University from September 17, 2007, to September 1, 2008, when Bill Purcell was appointed permanent director.

Previously, Leach served 30 years (1977–2007) as a Republican member of the United States House of Representatives, representing Iowa's 2nd congressional district (numbered as the 1st District from 1977 to 2003). In Congress, Leach chaired the House Committee on Banking and Financial Services (1995–2001) and was a senior member of the House Committee on International Relations, serving as Chair of the committee's Subcommittee on Asian and Pacific Affairs (2001–2006). He also founded and served as co-chair of the Congressional Humanities Caucus. He lost his 2006 re-election bid to Democrat Dave Loebsack. Leach sponsored the 1999 Gramm–Leach–Bliley Act, a notable piece of banking legislation of the 20th century.

In 2022, Leach broke with the Republicans and registered as a Democrat.

== Early life and education ==
James Albert Smith Leach was born in Davenport, Iowa on October 15, 1942. He won the 1960 state wrestling championship at the 138-pound weight class for Davenport High School. He graduated from Princeton University in 1964 with an A.B. in politics after completing a senior thesis titled "The Right to Revolt: John Locke Contrasted with Karl Marx." While a student at Princeton, Leach was a member of The Ivy Club. He then earned a Master of Arts degree in Soviet studies from Johns Hopkins University in 1966. He later did further Soviet research at the London School of Economics, where he studied under Leonard Schapiro, the foremost expert on Soviet affairs.

== Early career ==
Prior to entering the United States Foreign Service, he was a staffer for then U.S. Rep. Donald Rumsfeld. In 1969, he was an assistant to Rumsfeld, who had left his Congressional seat to become Director of the Office of Economic Opportunity in the Nixon administration. While in the Foreign Service, he was a delegate to the Geneva Disarmament Conference and the U.N. General Assembly. In 1973, Leach resigned his commission in protest of the Saturday Night Massacre when Richard Nixon fired his Attorney General, Elliot Richardson, and the independent counsel investigating the Watergate break-in, Archibald Cox.

== U.S. House of Representatives ==
After returning to Iowa to head a family business, Leach was elected in 1976 to Congress (defeating two-term Democrat Edward Mezvinsky), where he came to be a leader of a small band of moderate Republicans. He chaired two national organizations dedicated to moderate Republican causes: the Ripon Society and the Republican Mainstream Committee. He also served as president of the largest international association of legislators – Parliamentarians for Global Action.

During his 15 terms in Congress, Leach's voting record was generally conservative on fiscal issues, moderate on social matters, and progressive in foreign policy. As chair of the Arms Control and Foreign Policy Caucus, he pressed for a Comprehensive Test Ban and led the first House debate on a nuclear freeze. He objected to military unilateralism as reflected in the Iran-Contra policy of the 1980s. He pushed for full funding of U.S. obligations to the United Nations, supported U.S. re-entry into UNESCO, and opposed U.S. withdrawal from the compulsory jurisdiction of the International Court of Justice.

While he supported the first Gulf War in 1991, Leach was one of six House Republicans who voted against the authorization to use force against Iraq in 2002. He was one of three Republican congressmen (alongside Michael Castle and Amo Houghton) to vote against the 2003 extension of the Bush-era tax cuts.

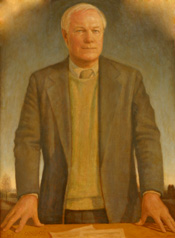
Portrait of Jim Leach, 2002, collection of U.S. House of Representatives

Leach supported abortion rights except during the third trimester but also opposed public funding of abortion, receiving an overall 30% rating from the Pro-Choice group NARAL. Leach was a supporter of stem cell research.

Leach supported campaign reform and pressed unsuccessfully for a system of partial public financing of elections whereby small contributions could be matched by federal funds with accompanying limits on the amounts that could be spent in campaigns including the personal resources candidates could put in their own races. In his own campaigns, Leach did not accept donations from outside of Iowa.

As a member of the minority for his first nine terms, he became known for the development of three reports – one in the 1980s calling for a more progressive approach to Central American politics; a second in the early 1990s on reforming the United Nations written for a national commission he legislatively established and later chaired; and the third issued when he was ranking minority member of the Banking Committee on the challenges of regulating derivatives.

In the wake of a 1996 Ethics Committee probe of then Speaker of the House Newt Gingrich, which cited the Speaker for providing false information under oath to a House committee, Leach broke ranks with tradition and voted against his party's nominee for Speaker in the subsequent Congress. In one of the few occasions in the 20th century when any party division was recorded on the initial leadership organizing votes on the House floor, he voted for the former Republican leader, Bob Michel, and received two votes himself, causing Leach to take a distant third in the contest for Speaker of the 105th Congress behind Gingrich and the Democratic nominee, Dick Gephardt.

Leach was a top critic of President Bill Clinton and played a leading role in the House's investigation of the Whitewater scandal. In the 1980s he had objected to political misjudgments that lengthened and deepened losses in the savings and loan industry. Because criminal referrals had been lodged by a federal agency against President Clinton, his wife, and their partners in a real estate venture for their role in the failure of a modest-sized Arkansas S&L, Leach as chair of the House Banking Committee held four days of hearings (all in the same week) on the causes and consequences of the failure. While federal taxpayer losses (approximately $70 million) associated with this particular S&L were not as large as with bigger institutions around the country, no S&L anywhere failed with a higher percentage of losses relative to assets than the one in Arkansas.

In the end, the independent counsel brought more than 50 criminal convictions related to the failed S&L, including cases against Clinton's successor as Governor of Arkansas, Jim Guy Tucker, and his business partners in Whitewater.

Leach did not think that the crimes surrounding the failure of the Whitewater-tied S&L should have been considered in an impeachment framework. Like many in Congress, he was surprised that the Justice Department chose to refer certain sex-related charges to Kenneth Starr, the Whitewater independent counsel, and even more so when Starr chose subsequently to refer certain of them to the Congress. But in what he described as a close judgment call, Leach voted for the article of impeachment that related to felonious lying under oath.

=== Gramm–Leach–Bliley Financial Services Modernization Act ===
The Gramm–Leach–Bliley Act, also known as the Gramm-Leach-Bliley Financial Services Modernization Act, Pub. L. No. 106–102, 113 Stat. 1338 (November 12, 1999), is an Act of the United States Congress which repealed part of the Glass–Steagall Act of 1933, opening up competition among banks, securities companies and insurance companies. The Glass–Steagall Act prohibited a bank from offering investment, commercial banking, and insurance services. This act of deregulation has been cited as one reason for the subprime mortgage crisis, which in turn is cited as a prime component of the 2008 financial crisis. In this regard in 2009 and since, Gramm–Leach has been considered in part a target of the Volcker Rule within the overall Dodd–Frank Wall Street Reform and Consumer Protection Act of 2010.

=== Elections ===
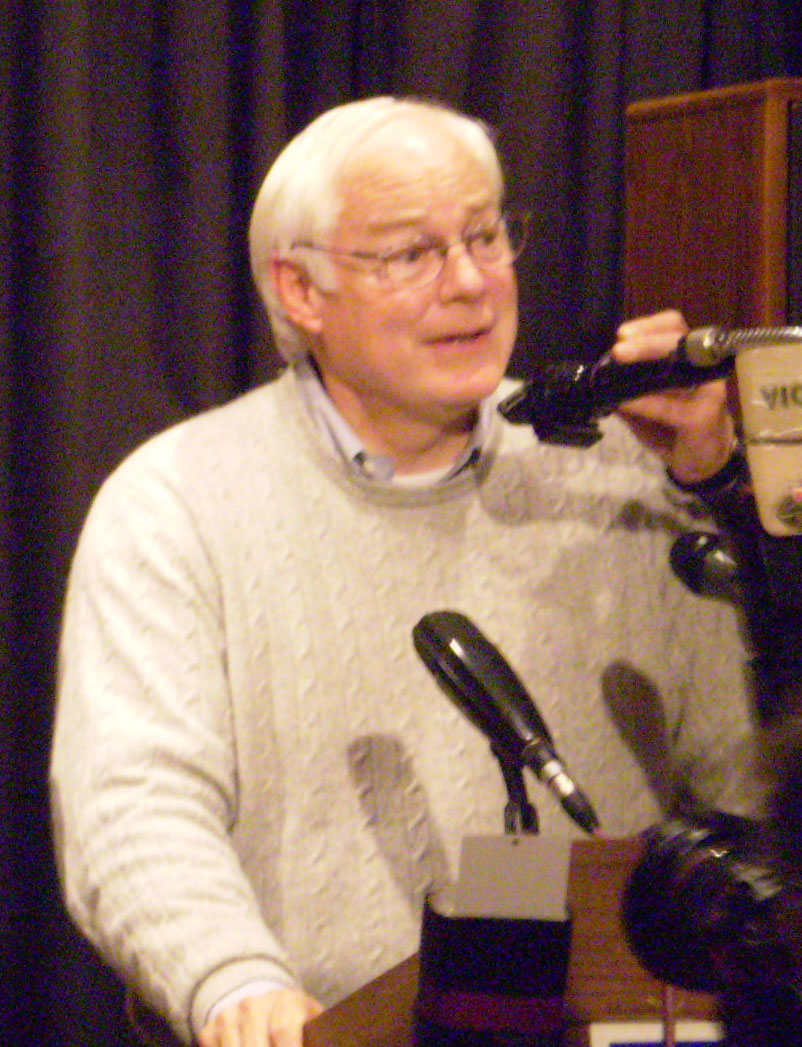
Leach, after poll results came in, greeting the press on election night in Cedar Rapids, 2006

Leach was usually reelected without much difficulty (including an unopposed run in 1990). He remained very popular in the 1st even as his district turned increasingly Democratic, especially from the 1990s onward. For most of his career, he represented the Democratic strongholds of Davenport, Cedar Rapids and Iowa City. The district had last supported a Republican for president in 1984, and by the mid-1990s most of its state legislators were Democrats. The district became even more Democratic after the 2000 census, in which it was renumbered the 2nd District. Additionally, his hometown of Davenport, which had anchored the district for decades, was drawn into the 1st District (previously the 2nd District). Leach seriously considered running against fellow Republican incumbent Jim Nussle in the 1st District primary. Had he done so, it was considered very likely that the reconfigured 2nd would have been taken by a Democrat. However, Leach opted to move to Iowa City in the reconfigured 2nd and won reelection two more times. Still, it was considered very likely that Leach would be succeeded by a Democrat once he retired.

=== 2006 election ===
In 2006, Leach was defeated in a considerable upset by Democratic opponent Dave Loebsack, a political science professor at Cornell College. Loebsack had only qualified for the Democratic primary as a write-in candidate, and Leach was not on many Democratic target lists. However, Loebsack won by a narrow margin of approximately 6,000 votes, largely by running up an 8,395-vote margin in Johnson County, home to Iowa City.

In conjunction with a Democratic tide which swept Eastern Iowa and across the U.S. in the 2006 election, there were two factors seen as what led to Leach's defeat: his refusal to allow the Republican National Committee to distribute leaflets that were seen as anti-gay, attacking Loebsack for his views on gay marriage, and his refusal to take out-of-state and political action committee money.

The second related to his success just before adjournment in passing H.R. 4411. Gambling interests opposed him during the election and contended the bill had passed without hearings. The bill had been subject to extensive hearings over several Congresses, especially on the House side where both the Financial Services and the Judiciary committees had shared jurisdiction. Leach argued that Internet gambling weakened the economy and jeopardized the social fabric of the family.

== Post-congressional career ==
After his defeat, Leach's name was floated as a potential replacement to John Bolton as Ambassador to the United Nations. On December 8, 2006, Leach's House colleagues Earl Blumenauer (D-Oregon) and Jim Walsh (R-New York) sent a letter to President George W. Bush urging the President to nominate Leach for the post. However, the nomination instead went to the United States Ambassador to Iraq, Zalmay Khalilzad.

Leach then taught at Princeton and served on the board of several public companies and four non-profit organizations, including the Century Foundation, the Kettering Foundation and the Carnegie Endowment for International Peace. He was a member of the Council on Foreign Relations and formerly served as a trustee of Princeton University.

Leach holds eight honorary degrees and has received decorations from two foreign governments. He is the recipient of the Wayne Morse Integrity in Politics Award, the Woodrow Wilson Award from Johns Hopkins, the Adlai Stevenson Award from the United Nations Association, and the Edger Wayburn Award from the Sierra Club. A three-sport athlete in college, Leach was elected to the National Wrestling Hall of Fame and Museum in Stillwater, Oklahoma, and the International Wrestling Hall of Fame in Waterloo, Iowa.

On September 17, 2007, Leach was named as Interim Director of the Institute of Politics (IOP) at Harvard Kennedy School after former director Jeanne Shaheen left to pursue a U.S. Senate seat in New Hampshire.

Leach resided in Iowa City and Princeton with his wife Elisabeth (Deba), son Gallagher, and daughter Jenny.

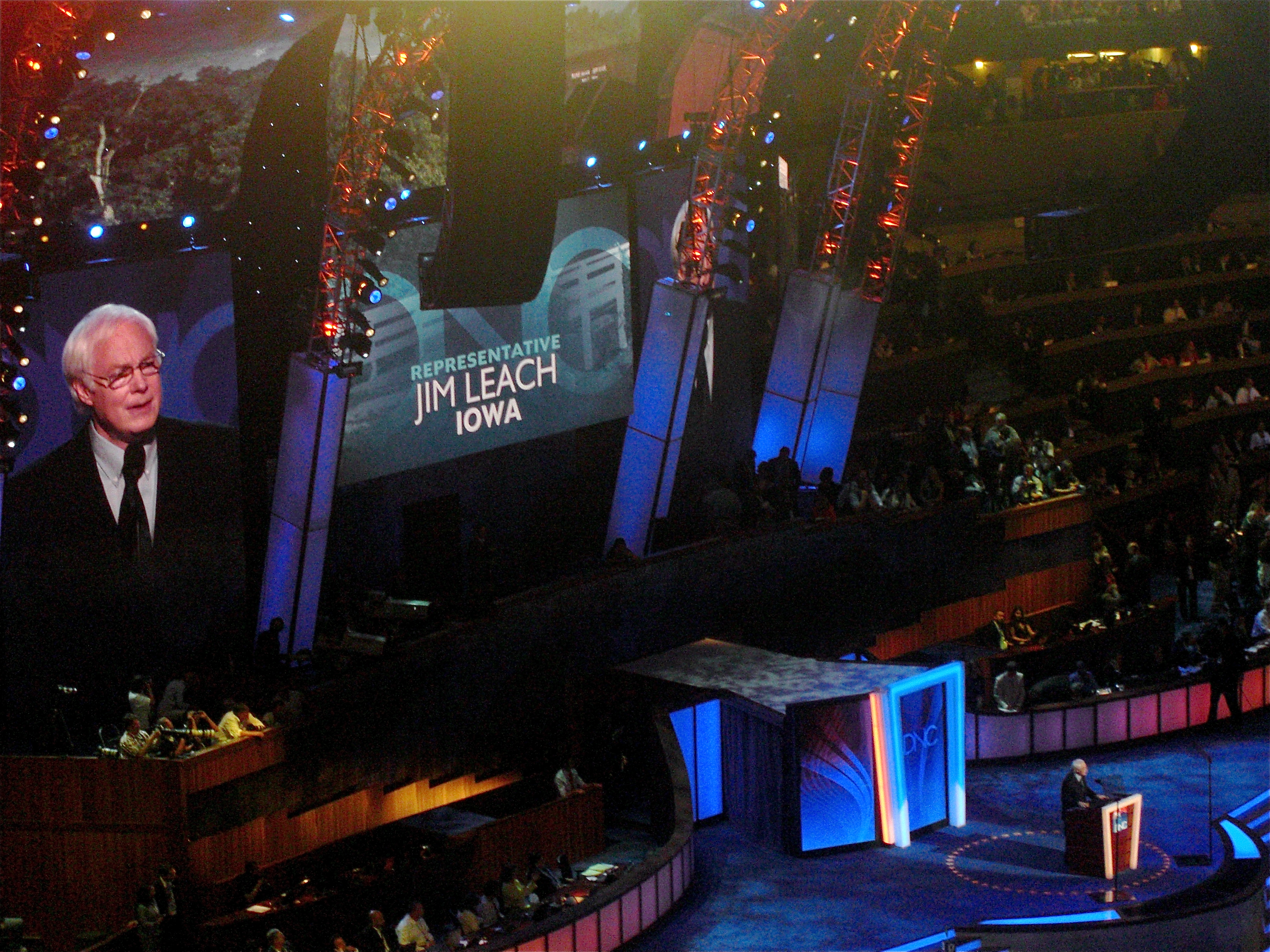
Leach speaks during the first night of the 2008 Democratic National Convention in Denver, Colorado.

On August 12, 2008, Leach broke party ranks to endorse Democrat Barack Obama over fellow Republican John McCain in the 2008 U.S. presidential election. He spoke at the 2008 Democratic National Convention in Denver, Colorado, on the night of August 25, 2008. He was introduced by Senator Tom Harkin, a fellow Iowan.

On November 14 and 15, 2008, Leach and former Clinton Secretary of State Madeleine Albright served as emissaries for President-elect Obama at the international economic summit being held in Washington, D.C.

President Obama announced his nomination of Leach to be the ninth Chair of the National Endowment for the Humanities in June 2009. The appointment was confirmed in August 2009.

On August 1, 2013, Jim Leach began serving a three-year term as public affairs chair at the University of Iowa and he was slated to begin teaching there as a visiting professor of law in the spring of 2014.

In 2020, Leach, along with over 130 other former Republican national security officials, signed a statement that asserted that President Trump was unfit to serve another term, and "To that end, we are firmly convinced that it is in the best interest of our nation that Vice President Joe Biden be elected as the next President of the United States, and we will vote for him."

In 2022, Leach revealed in an interview with the Quad-City Times that he had changed his registration to Democratic ahead of the June primary, citing his switch as a rebuke of the national party and their response to the January 6 United States Capitol attack the previous year. Leach also stated that he wanted to support Christina Bohannan, a Democratic candidate (and ultimately the nominee) for Iowa's 1st congressional district that year in the primary; he also endorsed Democratic U.S. Senate nominee Michael Franken.

Leach died on December 11, 2024, at a hospital in Iowa City, Iowa, from a heart attack and a stroke, at the age of 82.

== See also ==
- List of U.S. political appointments that crossed party lines

U.S. House of Representatives
Preceded by Edward Mezvinsky	Member of the House of Representatives from Iowa's 1st congressional district 1977–2003	Succeeded by Jim Nussle
Preceded by Chalmers Wylie	Ranking Member of the House Financial Services Committee; 1993–1995	Succeeded by Henry Gonzalez
Preceded by Henry Gonzalez	Chair of the House Financial Services Committee; 1995–2001	Succeeded by Mike Oxley
Preceded by Jim Nussle	Member of the House of Representatives from Iowa's 2nd congressional district 2003–2007	Succeeded by Dave Loebsack
Preceded by Max Baucus	Chair of the Joint China Commission; 2003–2005	Succeeded by Chuck Hagel
Government offices
Preceded by Carole Watson; Acting	Chair of the National Endowment for the Humanities; 2009–2013	Succeeded by Carole Watson; Acting
