= National Endowment for the Humanities =

Agency of the US government supporting the humanities

- Seal

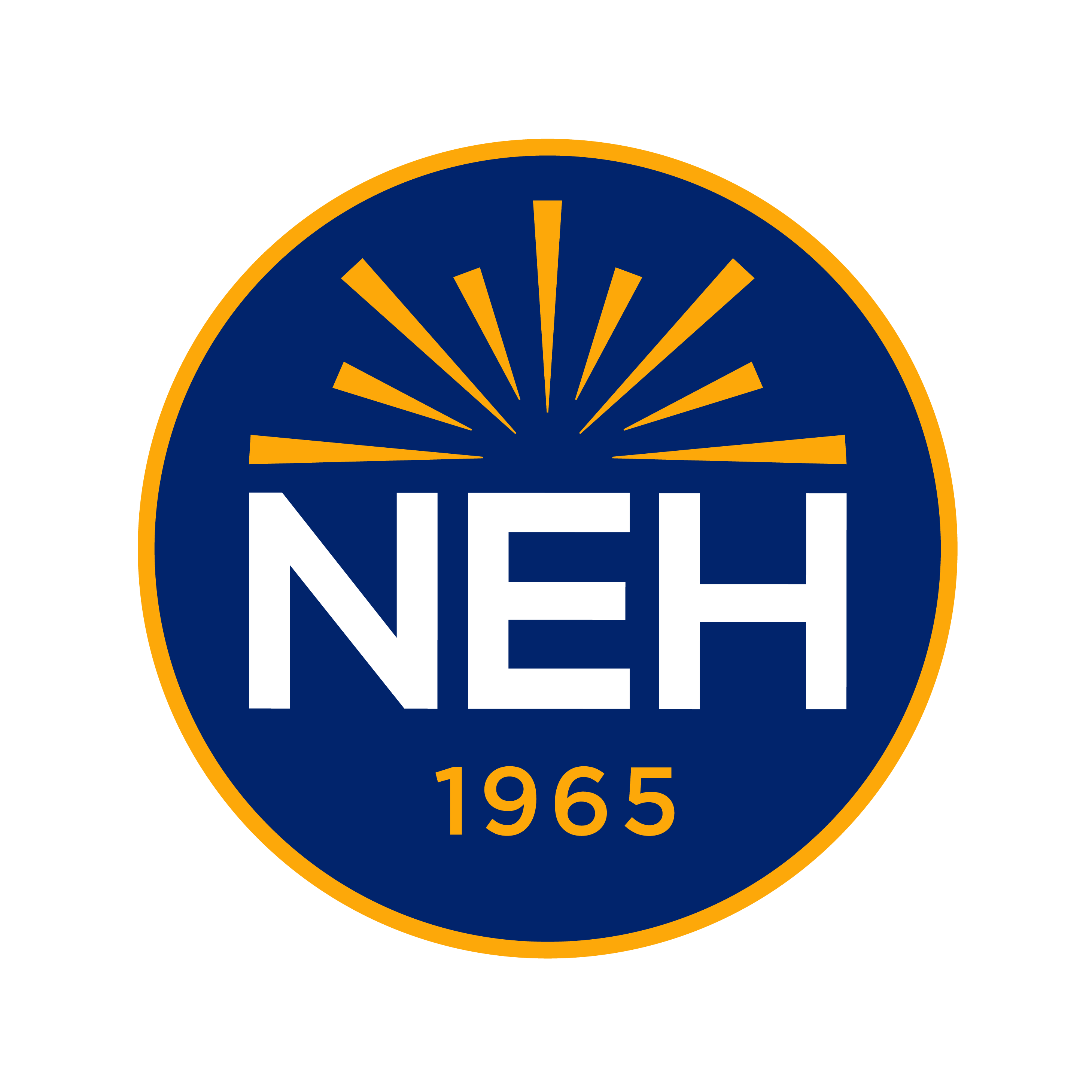
- Logo

Agency overview
- Formed: September 29, 1965
- Jurisdiction: Federal government of the United States
- Headquarters: Constitution Center, Washington, D.C.
- Employees: 63 (2025)
- Annual budget: $207 million (2023)
- Website: neh.gov

The National Endowment for the Humanities (NEH) is an independent federal agency of the U.S. government, established by the National Foundation on the Arts and the Humanities Act of 1965 (Pub. L. 89–209), dedicated to supporting research, education, preservation, and public programs in the humanities. The NEH is housed in the Constitution Center at 400 7th St SW, Washington, D.C. From 1979 to 2014, NEH was at 1100 Pennsylvania Avenue, N.W., Washington, D.C., in the Nancy Hanks Center at the Old Post Office.

== History and purpose ==
The NEH provides grants for high-quality humanities projects to cultural institutions such as museums, archives, libraries, colleges, universities, public television, and radio stations, and to individual scholars. According to its mission statement: "Because democracy demands wisdom, NEH serves and strengthens our republic by promoting excellence in the humanities and conveying the lessons of history to all Americans."

The NEH was created in 1965 as a sub-agency of the National Foundation on the Arts and the Humanities, which today also includes the National Endowment for the Arts, the Institute of Museum and Library Services, and the Federal Council on the Arts and the Humanities. NEH was based upon recommendation of the National Commission on the Humanities, convened in 1963 with representatives from three US scholarly and educational associations, the Phi Beta Kappa Society, the American Council of Learned Societies (ACLS), and the Council of Graduate Schools.

The agencies stated purpose is to create incentives for excellent work in the humanities by:

- awarding grants that strengthen teaching and learning in the humanities in schools and colleges
- facilitate research and original scholarship
- provide opportunities for lifelong learning
- preserve and provide access to cultural and educational resources
- strengthen the institutional base of the humanities.

As part of its mandate to support humanities programs in every US state and territory, the agency supports a network of private, nonprofit affiliates, the 56 humanities councils in the states and territories of the United States.

As of April 1, 2025, the agency was reportedly asked by the Department of Government Efficiency to reduce their staffing by up to 80%. At least 1,200 Biden-era grants were canceled the following week, including funding to state and jurisdictional humanities councils and a large percentage of staff put on administrative leave.

=== Jim Leach's tenure as NEH chair (2009–2013) ===
The ninth NEH chair was Jim Leach. President Obama nominated the former Iowa congressman, a Republican, to chair the NEH on June 3, 2009; the Senate confirmed his appointment in August 2009. Leach began his term as the NEH chair on August 12, 2009, and stepped down in May 2013. Between November 2009 and May 2011, Leach conducted the American "Civility Tour" to call attention to the need to restore reason and civility back into politics, a goal that in his words was "central to the humanities." Leach visited each of the 50 states, speaking at venues ranging from university and museum lecture halls to hospitals for veterans, to support the return of non-emotive, civil exchange and rational consideration of other viewpoints. According to Leach, "Little is more important...than establishing an ethos of thoughtfulness and decency of expression in the public square. Words reflect emotion as well as meaning. They clarify—or cloud—thought and energize action, sometimes bringing out the better angels in our nature, sometimes lesser instincts."

=== William Adams' tenure as NEH chair (2014–2017) ===
The 10th chair of the NEH, William Adams spearedheaded the "Common Good" initiative and the appointment of new administration officials.

Before Adams's appointment, the NEH was headed by Acting Chair Carole Watson.

=== Jon Parrish Peede's tenure as NEH Chair (2018–2022) ===
Appointed under Donald Trump, from 2018 to 2022, Jon Parrish Peede served as Chair of the NEH. On February 10, 2020, the NEH was presented by the Trump administration with a FY2021 budget that included a planned dissolution of the agency.

=== Shelly Lowe's tenure as NEH Chair (2022–2025) ===
Plans to close the agency were halted under the Biden administration and the NEH continues to operate and provides funding for various projects. In 2022, Shelly Lowe was confirmed as the chairman of the NEH. She is the first Native American to lead the agency. Congress appropriated US$180 million for the NEH in FY2022, and US$207 million in 2023.

Lowe resigned from her position in March 2025. A spokesman for the agency said Lowe left "at the direction of President Trump". Michael McDonald, the NEH's general counsel, is serving as acting chairman as of March 12, 2025.

== Leadership and initiatives ==
=== Governance ===
The Endowment is directed by the NEH chair. Advising the chair is the National Council on the Humanities, a board of 26 distinguished private citizens who are appointed by the president and confirmed by the Senate. The National Council members serve staggered six-year terms.

=== The NEH chair ===
The Endowment is directed by a chair, who has legal authority to approve all recommendations and award grants and cooperative agreements. The chair is nominated by the president and confirmed with the advice and consent of the U.S. Senate. The chair's decisions are informed by recommendations from the National Council on the Humanities, peer-reviewers who are selected to read each project proposal submitted to the Endowment, as well as by the Endowment's staff.

=== National Council on the Humanities ===
The council is composed of 27 members, 26 appointed by the president of the United States with the consent of the United States Senate and the chairperson of the NEH, who also serves as chair of the council. The twenty-six appointed by the President are selected from among private citizens of the United States who are recognized for their broad knowledge of, expertise in, or commitment to the humanities, and have established records of distinguished service and scholarship or creativity and in a manner which will provide a comprehensive representation of the views of scholars and professional practitioners in the humanities and of the public throughout the United States. In making these appointments, the President shall give due regard to equitable representation of women, minorities, and individuals with disabilities who are involved in the humanities, and may give consideration to such recommendations as may from time to time be submitted to him by leading national organizations concerned with the humanities.

These are appointed to serve terms of six years. The terms are staggered so a number of terms end January 26 every other year. The members are not eligible for reappointment during the two-year period following the expiration of their term. However, they may continue to serve on the council after their term's expiration until a successor takes office. Fourteen members of the council constitutes a quorum.

=== Current council members ===
The current council members as of May 6, 2026:

Position	Name	Assumed office	Term expiration	Appointed by
Chair	William English (Acting)	April 21, 2026	—	Donald Trump
Member	Russell A. Berman	August 5, 2019	January 26, 2020	Donald Trump
Member	Keegan F. Callanan	September 5, 2019	January 26, 2024	Donald Trump
Member	Matthew Rose	August 5, 2019	January 26, 2024	Donald Trump
Member	Vacant		January 26, 2030	
Member	Vacant		January 26, 2030	
Member	Vacant		January 26, 2032	
Member	Vacant		January 26, 2028	
Member	Vacant		January 26, 2028	
Member	Vacant		January 26, 2028	
Member	Vacant		January 26, 2030	
Member	Vacant		January 26, 2028	
Member	Vacant		January 26, 2028	
Member	Vacant		January 26, 2030	
Member	Vacant		January 26, 2030	
Member	Vacant		January 26, 2032	
Member	Vacant		January 26, 2028	
Member	Vacant		January 26, 2030	
Member	Vacant		January 26, 2028	
Member	Vacant		January 26, 2030	
Member	Vacant		January 26, 2028	
Member	Vacant		January 26, 2030	
Member	Vacant		January 26, 2032	
Member	Vacant		January 26, 2032	
Member	Vacant		January 26, 2030	
Member	Vacant		January 26, 2028	
Member	Vacant		January 26, 2030	

=== Nominations ===
President Trump has nominated the following to fill seats on the council. They await Senate confirmation.

Position	Name	Term expires	Replacing
Chair	Michael McDonald	Four year term	Shelly Lowe

=== Major program offices ===
The NEH has six grant-making divisions and offices:

- The Division of Preservation and Access awards grants to preserve, maintain, and improve access to primary sources in the humanities, in both digital and analog form.
- The Division of Public Programs supports projects that bring the humanities to large audiences through libraries and museums, television and radio, historic sites, and digital media.
- The Division of Research makes awards to support the publication of books in and outside the humanities.
- The Division of Education works to support and strengthen teaching of the humanities.
- The Office of Federal/State Partnership collaborates with 56 state and territory humanities councils to strengthen local programs.
- The Office of Digital Humanities advises on use of technology in the humanities and coordinates, and was established in 2008.

The Office of Challenge Grants, dissolved in 2017, administered grants intended to support capacity building and encourage fundraising in humanities institutions. The Division of Preservation and Access now offers a grant program that is similar to previous programs in the Challenge Grants office.

=== Special initiatives ===
These are special priorities of the endowment that indicate critical areas of the humanities as identified by the NEH chair. They differ from the divisions of the endowment in that they do not sponsor or coordinate specific grant programs.

==== Bridging Cultures initiative ====
Bridging Cultures was an NEH initiative that explored ways the humanities promote understanding and mutual respect for people with diverse histories, cultures, and perspectives. Projects supported through this initiative focused on cultures globally as well as within the United States.

==== Standing Together ====
This initiative, launched in 2014, marks a priority to make awards that promote understanding of the military experience and to support returning veterans.

==== We the People ====
We the People was an NEH special funding stream initiated by NEH chair Coles, using dedicated funds available to each chair of the NEH, which was designed to encourage and enhance the teaching, study, and understanding of American history, culture, and democratic principles. The initiative supports projects and programs that explore significant events and themes in American nation's history, which advance knowledge of the principles that define America.

According to NEH, the initiative led a renaissance in knowledge about American history and principles among all US citizens. The initiative was launched on Constitution Day, September 17, 2002, and active through 2009.

== Notable projects ==
Since 1965, the NEH has sponsored many projects, including:

- "Treasures of Tutankhamen", an exhibition seen by more than 1.5 million people.
- The Civil War, a 1990 documentary by Ken Burns seen by 38 million Americans.
- Library of America, editions of novels, essays, and poems celebrating America's literary heritage.
- United States Newspaper Project, an effort that cataloged and microfilmed 63.3 million pages of newspapers dating from the early United States. The program now digitizes newspapers and makes them available through Chronicling America, a web resource maintained by the Library of Congress.
- Fifteen Pulitzer Prize–winning books, including those by James M. McPherson, Louis Menand, Joan D. Hedrick, and Bernard Bailyn.
- EDSITEment, a Web project bringing the "best of the humanities on the web" to teachers and students, started in 1997.
- Reference archives, in Athens and Boston, of archaeological photographs taken by Eleanor Emlen Myers.
- The Valley of the Shadow, a digital history project created by Edward L. Ayers and William G. Thomas III on the experience of Confederate Civil War soldiers in the United States.
- What's on the Menu, digitization and community-sourced transcription of New York Public Library's restaurant menu collection.
- Katherine Anne Porter at 100, a conference at the University of Maryland featuring presentations on Porter and her work, film screenings, and exhibits containing items from Porter's papers.
- The Atlas of Historical County Boundaries, a historical atlas and geographic information system for U.S. county boundaries.

== Awards ==
=== Jefferson Lecture ===
Since 1972, the NEH has sponsored the Jefferson Lecture in the Humanities, which it describes as "the highest honor the federal government confers for distinguished intellectual achievement in the humanities." The Jefferson Lecturer is selected each year by the National Council on the Humanities. The honoree delivers a lecture in Washington, D.C., during the spring, and receives an honorarium of $10,000. The stated purpose of the honor is to recognize "an individual who has made significant scholarly contributions in the humanities and who has the ability to communicate the knowledge and wisdom of the humanities in a broadly appealing way."

=== National Humanities Medal and Charles Frankel Prize ===
The National Humanities Medal, inaugurated in 1997, honors individuals or groups whose work has deepened the nation's understanding of the humanities, broadened citizens' engagement with the humanities, or helped preserve and expand Americans' access to important resources in the humanities. Up to 12 medals can be awarded each year. From 1989 to 1996 the NEH awarded a similar prize known as the Charles Frankel Prize. The new award, a bronze medallion, was designed by David Macaulay, the 1995 winner of the Frankel Prize. Lists of the winners of the National Humanities Medal and the Frankel Prize are available at the NEH website.

== Humanities magazine ==
Starting in 1969, the NEH published a periodical called Humanities; that original incarnation was discontinued in 1978. In 1980, Humanities magazine was relaunched (ISSN 0018-7526). It is published six times per year, with one cover article each year dedicated to profiling that year's Jefferson Lecturer. Most of its articles have some connection to NEH activities. The magazine's editor since 2007 has been journalist and author David Skinner. From 1990 until her death in 2007, Humanities was edited by Mary Lou Beatty (who had previously been a high-ranking editor at the Washington Post).

== See also ==
- Chair of the National Endowment for the Humanities
- List of state humanities councils
- Institute of Museum and Library Services
- National Endowment for the Arts
- National Humanities Medal
- National Humanities Medal recipients
