= Dirk Geukens =

Belgian motocross racer (1963–2020)

- Nationality: Belgian
- Born: 29 June 1963 Mol, Belgium
- Died: 22 July 2020 (aged 57) Waalwijk, Netherlands

Motocross career
- Years active: 1984 - 1996
- Teams: Honda
- Wins: 2

Dirk Geukens (29 June 1963 – 22 July 2020) was a Belgian professional motocross racer. He competed in the Motocross World Championships from 1984 to 1996.

== Motocross career ==
Geukens competed in the FIM 250cc Motocross World Championship from 1984 to 1986. He moved up to the 500cc world championship from 1987 to 1996. Riding a Honda motorcycle, Geukens finished third overall behind Eric Geboers and Kurt Nicoll in the 500cc world championship in 1990. He repeated his third place finish in 1991 this time behind Georges Jobé and Jacky Martens. He won two Grand Prix races and finished on the podium eight times. During this period, he also won the Overpelt enduro. His final race win in the 500cc world championship was on 27 August 1995 at Reutlingen in Germany where he won the final race of the year. That day in Germany was also his final podium where he placed third overall behind Joel Smets and Dietmar Lacher. Guekens also helped the Belgium team to second overall in the 1990 Motocross des Nations at Vimmerby, Sweden and again in 1991 in Holland at Valkenswaard.

At the end of his career, Geukens was a rider for "Husaberg Fourstroke Force” team of Joël Smets and Ludo Van Der Veken. He lived in Balen where he was involved with Motorsport Future and trained motocross racer Jago Geerts.

== Death ==
In July 2020, Geukens was with his wife and a friendly couple on cycling holiday in the Netherlands. On 22 July after supper, he was not feeling well. He died later that evening, aged 57, presumably as a result of heart failure.
