= Michele Rinaldi (motorcyclist) =

Italian motorcycle racer (born 1959)

- Nationality: Italian
- Born: 9 March 1959 (age 67) Parma, Italy

Motocross career
- Years active: 1976 - 1987
- Teams: Ancilotti, Gilera, Suzuki
- Championships: 125cc - 1984
- Wins: 13

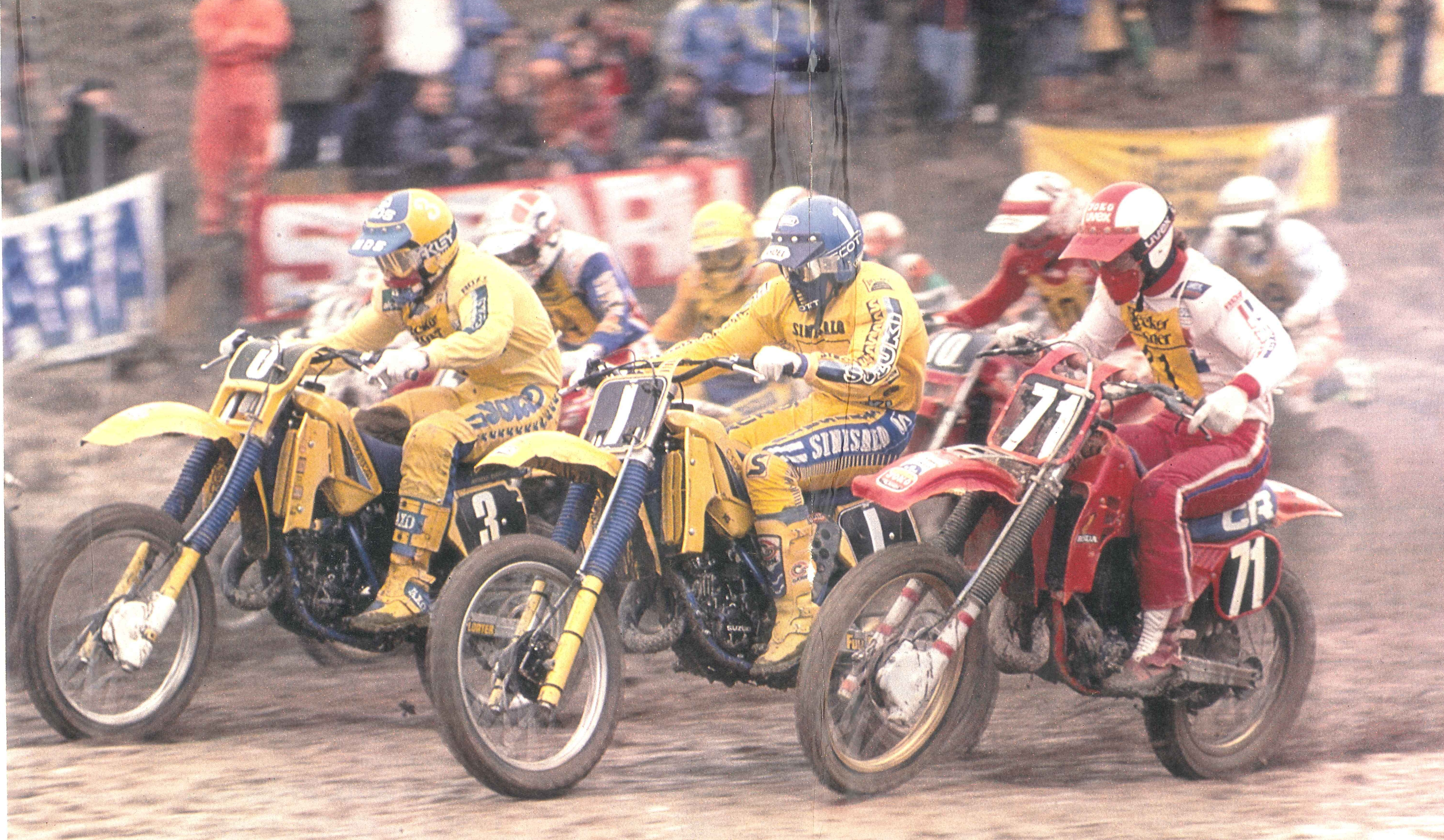
German 125ccm World Championship race 1983 - #3 Michele Rinaldi (left), #1 Eric Geboers (center), #71 Klaus-Bernd Kreutz (right)

Michele Rinaldi (born 9 March 1959 in Parma) is an Italian former professional motocross racer and current motorcycle race team manager. He competed in the Motocross World Championships from 1976 to 1987. Rinaldi is notable for being the first Italian competitor to win an FIM motocross world championship and, for the numerous world championships achieved as a motocross team manager.

== Biography ==
Rinaldi began competing in the 125cc motocross world championships in 1976, finishing in the top three for four consecutive years between 1980 and 1983, first for the Gilera team, then for the Suzuki team. In 1984, he finally captured the 125 title, becoming the first Italian to win a motocross world championship. He moved up to the 250 class with his best result being a second place in the 1986 world championship behind Jacky Vimond. He retired in 1987 after having competed in the Paris to Dakar rally.

When his riding career ended, Rinaldi became a successful motocross team manager for the Suzuki and Yamaha factory racing teams. As a team manager, he guided Bobby Moore, Alessandro Puzar, Andrea Bartolini, Stefan Everts, David Philippaerts and Romain Febvre to world championships.
