= New Zealand Motocross Championship =

Motocross Competition in New Zealand

- Category: Motocross
- Country: New Zealand
- Inaugural season: 1973

The New Zealand Motocross Championship is the premier domestic Motocross series in New Zealand, sanctioned by Motorcycling New Zealand.

The series runs annually throughout late winter and spring each year. The premier classes are MX1 and MX2 but there are also classes for younger riders, masters and women.

Prior to 1973, the series was known as the New Zealand Scrambles Championship.

== History ==
Motocross races first occurred in New Zealand during the 1940s and were known as Scrambles. These races were first collected into a championship in 1951, under the moniker of the New Zealand Scrambles Championship. This existed until 1973, when the series was renamed the New Zealand Motocross Championship. Several riders who have had considerable international success have raced in and won the championship on a number of occasions, including Shayne King, Darryl King, Josh Coppins and Ben Townley. The classes within the championship have evolved over time in line with what has been seen in the sport around the world.

== Event Format ==
Rounds of the New Zealand Motocross Championship typically have a one-day format. Each class has both a short free practice session and a longer qualifying practice session, followed by three main points paying races that contribute to the final overall standings per round.

Points are awarded to finishers of the main races, in the following format:

Position	1st	2nd	3rd	4th	5th	6th	7th	8th	9th	10th	11th	12th	13th	14th	15th	16th	17th	18th	19th	20th
Points	25	22	20	18	16	15	14	13	12	11	10	9	8	7	6	5	4	3	2	1

== List of Champions ==
Season	MX1 Champion	MX2 Champion	
2027			
2026	(New Zealand) Maximus Purvis	(New Zealand) Hayden Draper	
2025	(New Zealand) Maximus Purvis	(New Zealand) Madoc Dixon	
2024	(New Zealand) Hamish Harwood	(New Zealand) James Scott	
2023	(New Zealand) Maximus Purvis	(New Zealand) Cody Cooper	
2022	Cancelled due to COVID-19 pandemic		
2021	(New Zealand) Hamish Harwood	(New Zealand) Maximus Purvis	
2020	(Australia) Kirk Gibbs	(New Zealand) Maximus Purvis	
2019	(New Zealand) Cody Cooper	(New Zealand) Hamish Harwood	
2018	(Australia) Kirk Gibbs	(New Zealand) Hamish Harwood	
2017	(New Zealand) Cody Cooper	(New Zealand) Hamish Harwood	
2016	(New Zealand) Cody Cooper	(New Zealand) Hamish Harwood	
2015	(New Zealand) Cody Cooper	(Australia) Jay Wilson	
2014	(New Zealand) Cody Cooper	(New Zealand) Kayne Lamont	
2013	(New Zealand) Cody Cooper	(New Zealand) Scott Columb	
2012	(New Zealand) Ben Townley	(New Zealand) Darryl King	
2011	(New Zealand) Cody Cooper	(New Zealand) Darryl King	
2010	No Championship		
2009	(New Zealand) Justin McDonald	(New Zealand) Michael Phillips	
2008	(New Zealand) Damien King	(New Zealand) Daryl Hurley	
	250cc Champion	125cc Champion	500cc Champion
2007	(New Zealand) Michael Phillips	(New Zealand) Damien King	(New Zealand) Daryl Hurley
2006	(New Zealand) Darryl King	(New Zealand) Damien King	(New Zealand) Darryl King
2005	(New Zealand) Shayne King	(New Zealand) Cody Cooper	(New Zealand) Shayne King
2004	(New Zealand) Shayne King	(New Zealand) Daryl Hurley	(New Zealand) Shayne King
2003	(New Zealand) Shayne King	(New Zealand) Cody Cooper	(New Zealand) Shayne King
2002	(New Zealand) Darryl King	(New Zealand) Daryl Hurley	(New Zealand) Darryl King
2001	(New Zealand) Darryl King	(New Zealand) Daryl Hurley	(New Zealand) Corrie Sargent
2000	(New Zealand) Mike Cotter	(New Zealand) Andrew Hardisty	(New Zealand) Corrie Sargent
1999	(New Zealand) Mike Cotter	(New Zealand) Daryl Hurley	(New Zealand) Mike Cotter
1998	(New Zealand) Josh Coppins	(New Zealand) Josh Coppins	(New Zealand) Mitch Rowe
1997	(New Zealand) Shayne King	(New Zealand) Brad Thomas	(New Zealand) Shayne King
1996	(New Zealand) Darryl King	(New Zealand) Damien King	-
1995	(New Zealand) Andrew Hardisty	(New Zealand) Darryl King	-
1994	(New Zealand) Shayne King	(New Zealand) Shayne King	-
1993	(New Zealand) Shayne King	(New Zealand) Shayne King	-
1992	(New Zealand) Shayne King	(New Zealand) Darryl Atkins	-
1991	(New Zealand) Darryl King	(New Zealand) Darryl King	-
1990	(New Zealand) Shayne King	?	-
1989	(New Zealand) Shayne King	(New Zealand) L. Andrew	-
1988	(New Zealand) Darryl King	(New Zealand) Darryl Atkins	-
	250cc Champion	125cc Champion	Open Champion
1987	(New Zealand) Graeme Allan	(New Zealand) Shayne King	(United Kingdom) Greg Hanson
1986	(Australia) Craig Dack	(New Zealand) Darryl King	(New Zealand) Graeme Allan
1985	(United Kingdom) Perry Leask	(United Kingdom) Greg Hanson	(New Zealand) Murray Anderson
1984	(United Kingdom) Perry Leask	(New Zealand) Jonathan Wright	(New Zealand) Bryan Patterson
1983	(New Zealand) Murray Anderson	(New Zealand) Terry Meeks	(Australia) Jeff Leisk
1982	(New Zealand) Murray Anderson	(New Zealand) R. Saunders	(New Zealand) Frank White
1981	(New Zealand) Chris Maindonald	(New Zealand) Mitch Anderson	(New Zealand) Ivan Miller
1980	(New Zealand) Craig Coleman (New Zealand) Gary Goodfellow	(New Zealand) Mitch Anderson	(New Zealand) Ivan Miller
1979	(New Zealand) Peter Ploen	(New Zealand) Terry Meeks	(New Zealand) Greg Brinck
1978	(New Zealand) Greg Brinck	(New Zealand) Terry Meeks	(New Zealand) Ivan Miller
	A Grade Champion	125cc Champion	
1977	(New Zealand) Ivan Miller	(New Zealand) Phil Turnbull	-
1976	(New Zealand) Paul Harrison	-	-
1975	(New Zealand) Peter Ploen	(New Zealand) John Gibbons	-
1974	(New Zealand) Peter Ploen	(New Zealand) Roddy Shirriffs	-
1973	(New Zealand) Peter Ploen	-	-
