= Marnicq Bervoets =

Belgian motorcycle racer (born 1969)

- Nationality: Belgian
- Born: 21 June 1969 (age 55); Paal, Belgium

Motocross career
- Years active: 1990 - 2004
- Teams: Suzuki, Yamaha
- Wins: 19

Marnicq Bervoets (born 21 June 1969 in Paal), is a Belgian former professional motocross racer. He competed in the Motocross World Championships from 1990 to 2004. Bervoets is notable for being a three-time vice-champion in the 250cc motocross world championships.

== Motocross racing career ==
Bervoets was one of the top motocross competitors in the 1990s. Riding for the Suzuki factory team, he finished second to perennial champion Stefan Everts three times in the F.I.M. 250cc motocross world championships from 1995 to 1997. He switched to the Yamaha factory racing team and moved to the 500cc class, finishing in second place in 2000 and third in 2001. Bervoets was a member of three winning Belgian teams at the Motocross des Nations.
