= David Strijbos =

Dutch motorcycle racer

Dave Strijbos
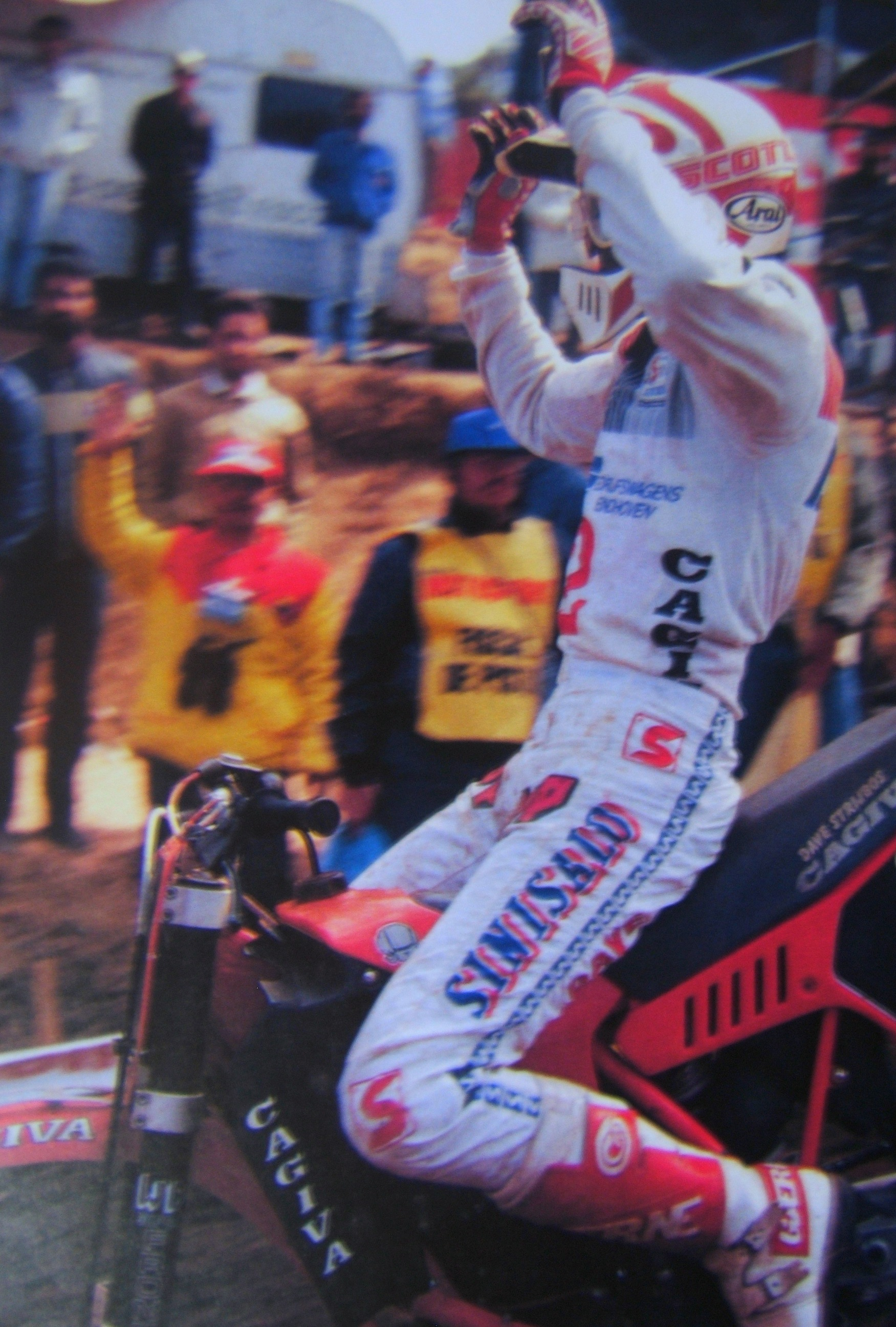
- Strijbos in 1986
- Nationality: Dutch
- Born: 8 November 1967 (age 58) Venlo, Netherlands

Motocross career
- Years active: 1984 - 1995
- Teams: Cagiva, Honda
- Championships: 125cc - 1986
- Wins: 27

Dave Strijbos (born 8 November 1967) is a Dutch former professional motocross racer. He competed in the Motocross World Championships from 1984 to 1995. Strijbos is notable for being the first Dutch competitor to win an FIM motocross world championship.

== Biography ==
Born in Venlo, Netherlands, Strijbos was one of the top competitors in the 125cc motocross world championships in the late 1980s and early 1990s. He won his first international race at the 1984 125cc Dutch Grand Prix when he was only sixteen years old to become the youngest-ever Grand Prix winner until Ken Roczen won a Grand Prix at the age of 15 in 2009. He finished the season ranked sixth in the 125cc motocross world championship. In 1985, he won four Grand Prix races and finished the season ranked second in the 125cc motocross world championship, just nine points behind world champion Pekka Vehkonen.

In 1986, Strijbos won the 125 motocross world championship while riding for Cagiva. At the age of 18, he became the youngest-ever motocross world champion until Ken Roczen won the 2011 MX2 world championship at the age of 17.

Strijbos finished second to John van den Berk in the 1987 125 motocross world championship then, once again finished second in the 1988 championship, only three points behind Jean-Michel Bayle. In 1989, Strijbos switched to Suzuki and dropped to 7th place in the 125 motocross world championship. In 1990 he competed for Kawasaki in the 250cc class where he ended the season ranked fifth in the world championship. Strijbos switched to Suzuki in 1991 and finished the season ranked seventh in the 250cc motocross world championship. He returned to the 125cc class in 1991 and, once again finished in second place, this time behind Greg Albertyn.
