= Andrea Bartolini =

Italian motorcycle racer (born 1968)

- Nationality: Italian
- Born: November 1968 (age 57) Imola, Italy

Motocross career
- Years active: 1988 - 2003
- Teams: Yamaha
- Championships: 500cc - 1999
- Wins: 15

Andrea Bartolini (born November 1968) is an Italian former professional motocross racer. He competed in the Motocross World Championships from 1988 to 2003. Bartolini is notable for winning the 1999 500cc motocross world championship.

== Motocross racing career ==
Born in Imola, Italy, Bartolini competed for the Yamaha motocross team run by former world champion Michele Rinaldi. He finished fifth in the 500cc motocross world championships in 1997 and 1998 before winning the title in 1999. In 2003, he placed third in the 125cc motocross world championship.

Bartolini was a member of two victorious Italian Motocross des Nations teams, winning the event in 1999 with teammates Alessio Chiodi and Claudio Federici then, in 2002 with teammates Chiodi and Alessandro Puzar. In 2005, he competed in the Supermoto world championships. He remains the only Italian to have won a 500cc motocross world championship.
