= Yasin Karaca =

Turkish footballer

Personal information
- Date of birth: 16 December 1983 (age 42)
- Place of birth: Paal, Belgium
- Height: 1.69 m (5 ft 7 in)
- Positions: Attacking midfielder; winger; striker

Youth career
- 1993–1998: K. Beringen
- 1998–2001: Anderlecht

Senior career*
Years	Team	Apps	(Gls)
2001–2003	Anderlecht	1	(0)
2002	→ K.V.C. Westerlo (loan)	11	(0)
2003	→ De Graafschap (loan)	1	(0)
2003–2004	A. Sebatspor	3	(0)
2004–2005	K.V. Oostende	17	(0)
2005–2006	Türk Telekomspor	7	(0)
2006–2007	Ethnikos Asteras	0	(0)
2007	Sivasspor	14	(2)
2008	→ Kırşehirspor (loan)		
2008–2010	AFC Tubize	22	(1)
2010–2012	F91 Dudelange	36	(10)
2012–2013	Wiltz	10	(2)
2013–2014	Olympic Charleroi	10	(2)
2014–2015	KV Turnhout	12	(1)
2015	RKSV Minor		
2015–2016	FC Turkse Rangers		
2016–2017	KFC Hamont 99		
2017–2018	VK Gestel		

International career
2002	Turkey U21	1	(0)
2002–2003	Turkey U20	6	(0)
2001	Turkey U19	2	(2)
2000–2001	Turkey U17	11	(2)
1998–1999	Turkey U16	2	(0)
1998	Turkey U15	2	(0)
- * Club domestic league appearances and goals

Yasin Karaca (born 16 December 1983) is a Turkish former footballer who played as a midfielder.

== Career ==
Karaca was born in Paal, Belgium to ethnic Azerbaijani parents originally from Iğdır, Turkey.

He can play as an attacking midfielder or as a striker. Karaca spent the second half of the 2007–08 season on loan at Yeni Kırşehirspor in TFF Second League. He also spent a few weeks on trial with Galatasaray during the winter break of 2002–03 season.

Karaca is a product of the Anderlecht youth system. However, he could never make it to the big scene so far although he was capped several times for Turkey national youth football teams.

In early August 2011, Karaca has been on trial at newly promoted Serbian SuperLiga club FK Novi Pazar.

After a small period in Luxemburg First Division sides Dudelange and Wiltz he came back to Belgian 4th Division side R. Olympic Charleroi at mid-season 2012–2013.
