= Trampas Parker =

American motorcycle racer

- Born: July 27, 1967 (age 59) Shreveport, Louisiana, U.S.

Motocross career
- Years active: 1985 - 2005
- Teams: KTM, Honda
- Championships: 125cc - 1989; 250cc - 1991
- Wins: 13

Trampas Parker (born July 27, 1967) is an American former professional motocross racer. He competed in the AMA Motocross Championships in 1985 and 1986 and in the Motocross World Championships from 1988 to 2004. Parker is notable for being the first American racer to claim two motocross world championships. He was inducted into the AMA Motorcycle Hall of Fame in 2007.

== Biography ==
Born in Shreveport, Louisiana, Parker was the 1989 FIM world champion in the 125cc class on a KTM. In 1991, he won the 250 world championship on a Honda.

In 1995, Parker entered the premier 500cc class with KTM in an attempt to become the second competitor in FIM history after Eric Geboers to win motocross world championships in the three main displacement categories (125cc, 250cc and 500cc classes). He battled against Joël Smets on a four-stroke Husaberg, in a championship that wasn't decided until the final race of the season, when Smets was declared the champion with Parker as the first runner-up.
