= FIM Veteran Motocross World Cup =

FIM Veteran Motocross World Championship
- Category: Motocross
- Country: International
- Inaugural season: 2006
- Riders' champion: (New Zealand) Darryl King
- Constructors' champion: (Japan) Yamaha

The FIM Veteran Motocross World Cup is a motocross championship for more experienced riders, inaugurated in 2006, and is a feeder series to the FIM Motocross World Championship.

== Champions ==
Season	Rider	Constructor
2006	(Netherlands) Marc van den Brink	(Japan) Suzuki
2007	(New Zealand) Tony Cooksley	(Japan) Yamaha
2008	(Belgium) Peter Iven	(Japan) Kawasaki
2009	(Sweden) Mats Nilsson	(Japan) Yamaha
2010	(Sweden) Mats Nilsson	(Japan) Yamaha
2011	(Belgium) Pascal Bal	(Japan) Yamaha
2012	(New Zealand) Darryl King	(Japan) Yamaha
2013	(Sweden) Mats Nilsson	(Japan) Yamaha
2014	(Czech Republic) Martin Zerava	(Japan) Suzuki
2015	(Sweden) Mats Nilsson	(Japan) Yamaha
