= Shane King =

Shane King may refer to:

- Shane King (Gaelic footballer), Fermanagh Football Team 1996
- Shane King (politician), Australian politician
- Shayne King, racing driver
