= Marcus Hansson =

Swedish motocross racer

- Nationality: Swedish
- Born: 18 October 1969 (age 56) Borås, Sweden

Motocross career
- Years active: 1990 - 1995
- Teams: Honda
- Championships: 500cc - 1994
- Wins: 5

Marcus Hansson (born 18 October 1969) is a Swedish former professional motocross racer. He won the 1994 500cc Grand Prix Motocross World Championship.

Born in Borås, Sweden, Hansson rode a Honda to win the F.I.M. 500cc motocross world championship in 1994, defeating Jacky Martens and Joël Smets. He retired from racing after being injured in a supercross race in 1995. Hansson was the latest Swedish rider to win a motocross world championship.
