= Pedro Tragter =

Dutch motorcycle racer

- Nationality: Dutch
- Born: 10 July 1968 (age 57) Epse, Netherlands

Motocross career
- Years active: 1987−1997
- Teams: Suzuki
- Championships: 125cc - 1993
- Wins: 7

Pedro Tragter (born 10 July 1968) is a Dutch former professional motocross racer. He competed in the Motocross World Championships from 1987 to 1997. Tragter is notable for winning the 1993 FIM 125cc motocross world championship.

Born in Epse, Netherlands, Tragter was one of the top competitors in the 125cc motocross world championships in the late 1980s and early 1990s. He finished third in the 125 world championship in 1988, 1991, 1992 and 1994. In 1993, Tragter won the 125 world championship while riding for the Sylvain Geboers-Suzuki racing team. He was also successful in motorcycle enduro, competing for the Dutch team in the International Six Days Enduro in 2005.
