= Katherine Prumm =

New Zealand motorcycle racer (born 1988)

- Nationality: New Zealand
- Born: 4 June 1988 (age 38) South Africa

Motocross career
- Years active: 1998 – 2009
- Teams: Kawasaki; Yamaha
- Championships: 2 (2006, 2007)

Katherine Prumm (born 4 June 1988), currently known by her married name, Katherine Oberlin-Brown, is a former New Zealand professional motocross rider. In 2006 and 2007, she won two consecutive Women's Motocross World Cups. In 2019, she was inducted into the MNZ Hall of Fame, the New Zealand Motorcycling Hall of Fame.

== Career ==
Born in South Africa, Prumm emigranted with her family to New Zealand in 1995, when she was seven years old. The Prumms settled in Bombay, south of the Auckland Region. There, she took up motocross in 1998, at the age of ten, often competing against male rivals, and soon achieved notable victories, both domestically and in Australia and Japan. Thanks to her achievements, she joined the official Kawasaki team.

In 2005, at the age of 17, Prumm competed in the first Women's Motocross World Cup, the forerunner of the current World Championship (WMX) and finished second behind the German Stephanie Laier. In 2006 and 2007, she won the World Cup. In the 2008 season, Prumm left Kawasaki and signed with Yamaha. That year, when the World Cup became a World Championship, she came close to winning the title, but lost her chances when she broke her collarbone and wrist just two rounds from the end of the championship, during a training session in Belgium, and she had finished in the ninth position.

Prumm's racing career was cut short shortly before the start of the 2009 season. In a training session in New Zealand she landed badly after a jump and broke her back in three places (specifically the vertebrae T6, T9 and T12). Although it appeared that she would never be able to walk again, she eventually fully recovered from her injuries, but her time as a motocross racer came to an end.

== Life after racing ==
Despite having to retire from motocross, Prumm is still involved in the elite sport. After graduating from university with a degree in sport and exercise science she began working as a physiologist at High Performance Sport New Zealand (HPSNZ), from where she supports New Zealand's elite athletes.
