= Motocross World Championship =

Sporting event

- Official logo
- Category: Motocross
- Region: International
- Official website: MXGP.com

MXGP World Championship
- Manufacturers: Beta, Ducati, Fantic, Gas Gas, Honda, Husqvarna, Kawasaki, KTM, Triumph, Yamaha
- Riders' champion: (Netherlands) Jeffrey Herlings
- Makes' champion: (Japan) Honda

MX2 World Championship
- Manufacturers: Fantic, Gas Gas, Honda, Husqvarna, Kawasaki, KTM, Triumph, Yamaha
- Riders' champion: (Spain) Guillem Farrés
- Makes' champion: (United Kingdom) Triumph

MXW World Championship
- Manufacturers: Fantic, Gas Gas, Honda, Husqvarna, Kawasaki, KTM, Yamaha
- Riders' champion: (Spain) Daniela Guillén
- Makes' champion: (Spain) Gas Gas

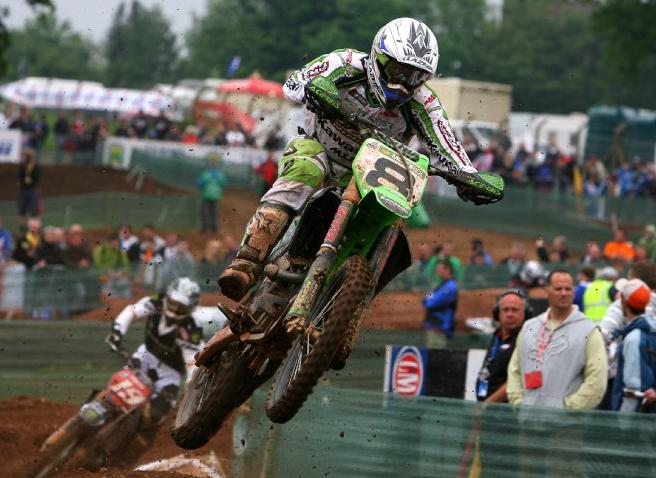
Tanel Leok in 2008

The FIM Motocross World Championship is the premier championship of motocross racing, organized by the Fédération Internationale de Motocyclisme (FIM), divided into two distinct classes: MXGP and MX2. Race duration is 30 minutes plus two laps per race. The series runs 20 events with two races per class, including a point-scoring qualification race. The FIM Women's Motocross World Championship (MXW) is a women-only motocross championship, inaugurated in 2005, and is a feeder series to the FIM Motocross World Championship.

== History ==
The FIM Motocross World Championship is a worldwide motocross series sanctioned by the F.I.M. It was inaugurated in 1957 using a 500 cc engine displacement formula. In 1962 a 250cc class was added and in 1975, a 125cc class was introduced. Prior to 1957, the championship was known as the European Championship.

In 2004, the F.I.M. changed the displacement formulas to reflect the changes in engine technology and as a move towards environmentally friendlier four-stroke engines. The new MX1 class became the premier class, allowing two-stroke engines of up to 250cc and four-stroke engines of up to 450cc. The MX2 class allowed two-stroke engines of up to 125cc and four-stroke motors of up to 250cc. The MX3 class allowed two-stroke engines of up to 500cc and four stroke engines of up to 650cc.

== World Champions by year ==
European Championship only

Year	500cc
1952	1) (Belgium) Victor Leloup (Saroléa); 2) (Belgium) Auguste Mingels (Matchless); 3) (United Kingdom) John Avery (BSA)
1953	1) (Belgium) Auguste Mingels (FN); 2) (Belgium) René Baeten (Saroléa); 3) (Belgium) Victor Leloup (FN)
1954	1) (Belgium) Auguste Mingels (FN); 2) (Belgium) René Baeten (Saroléa); 3) (United Kingdom) Jeff Smith (Note: Smith finished third even if on equal points with Leolup by virtue of the best result obtained in the grand prix: a victory against a second place.) (BSA)
1955	1) (United Kingdom) John Draper (BSA); 2) (Sweden) Bill Nilsson (BSA); 3) (Sweden) Sten Lundin (BSA)
1956	1) (United Kingdom) Les Archer (Norton); 2) (United Kingdom) John Draper (BSA); 3) (Belgium) Nic Jansen (Matchless)

Year	500cc	250cc
1957	1) (Sweden) Bill Nilsson (AJS); 2) (Belgium) René Baeten (FN); 3) (Sweden) Sten Lundin (Monark)	1) (Germany) Fritz Betzelbacher (Maico); 2) (Germany) Willi Oesterle (Maico); 3) (Czechoslovakia) Jaromír Čížek (Jawa)
1958	1) (Belgium) René Baeten (FN); 2) (Sweden) Bill Nilsson (Crescent); 3) (Sweden) Sten Lundin (Monark)	1) (Czechoslovakia) Jaromír Čížek (Jawa); 2) (Sweden) Rolf Tibblin (Husqvarna); 3) (Germany) Rolf Müller (Maico)
1959	1) (Sweden) Sten Lundin (Monark); 2) (Sweden) Bill Nilsson (Crescent); 3) (United Kingdom) David Curtis (Matchless)	1) (Sweden) Rolf Tibblin (Husqvarna); 2) (United Kingdom) Brian Stonebridge (Greeves); 3) (Czechoslovakia) Jaromír Čížek (Jawa)
1960	1) (Sweden) Bill Nilsson (Husqvarna); 2) (Sweden) Sten Lundin (Monark); 3) (Sweden) Rolf Tibblin (Husqvarna)	1) (United Kingdom) Dave Bickers (Greeves); 2) (United Kingdom) Jeff Smith (BSA); 3) (Czechoslovakia) Miroslav Souchek (ČZ)
1961	1) (Sweden) Sten Lundin (Lito); 2) (Sweden) Bill Nilsson (Husqvarna); 3) (Sweden) Gunnar Johansson (Lito)	1) (United Kingdom) Dave Bickers (Greeves); 2) (United Kingdom) Arthur Lampkin (BSA); 3) (United Kingdom) Jeff Smith (BSA)
1962	1) (Sweden) Rolf Tibblin (Husqvarna); 2) (Sweden) Gunnar Johansson (Lito); 3) (Sweden) Sten Lundin (Lito)	1) (Sweden) Torsten Hallman (Husqvarna); 2) (United Kingdom) Jeff Smith (BSA); 3) (United Kingdom) Arthur Lampkin (BSA)
1963	1) (Sweden) Rolf Tibblin (Husqvarna); 2) (Sweden) Sten Lundin (Lito); 3) (United Kingdom) Jeff Smith (BSA)	1) (Sweden) Torsten Hallman (Husqvarna); 2) (Czechoslovakia) Vlastimil Valek (ČZ); 3) (Soviet Union) Igor Grigoriev (ČZ)
1964	1) (United Kingdom) Jeff Smith (BSA); 2) (Sweden) Rolf Tibblin (Hedlund); 3) (Sweden) Sten Lundin (Lito)	1) (Belgium) Joël Robert (ČZ); 2) (Sweden) Torsten Hallman (Husqvarna); 3) (Soviet Union) Victor Arbekov (ČZ)
1965	1) (United Kingdom) Jeff Smith (BSA); 2) (East Germany) Paul Friedrichs (ČZ); 3) (Sweden) Rolf Tibblin (ČZ)	1) (Soviet Union) Victor Arbekov (ČZ); 2) (Belgium) Joël Robert (ČZ); 3) (United Kingdom) Dave Bickers (Greeves)
1966	1) (East Germany) Paul Friedrichs (ČZ); 2) (Sweden) Rolf Tibblin (ČZ); 3) (United Kingdom) Jeff Smith (BSA)	1) (Sweden) Torsten Hallman (Husqvarna); 2) (Belgium) Joël Robert (ČZ); 3) (Czechoslovakia) Petr Dobry (ČZ)
1967	1) (East Germany) Paul Friedrichs (ČZ); 2) (United Kingdom) Jeff Smith (BSA); 3) (United Kingdom) Dave Bickers (ČZ)	1) (Sweden) Torsten Hallman (Husqvarna); 2) (Belgium) Joël Robert (ČZ); 3) (Sweden) Olle Petterson (Husqvarna)
1968	1) (East Germany) Paul Friedrichs (ČZ); 2) (United Kingdom) John Banks (BSA); 3) (Sweden) Åke Jonsson (Husqvarna)	1) (Belgium) Joël Robert (ČZ); 2) (Sweden) Torsten Hallman (Husqvarna); 3) (Belgium) Sylvain Geboers (ČZ)
1969	1) (Sweden) Bengt Åberg (Husqvarna); 2) (United Kingdom) John Banks (BSA); 3) (East Germany) Paul Friedrichs (ČZ)	1) (Belgium) Joël Robert (ČZ); 2) (Belgium) Sylvain Geboers (ČZ); 3) (Sweden) Olle Petterson (Suzuki)
1970	1) (Sweden) Bengt Åberg (Husqvarna); 2) (Sweden) Arne Kring (Husqvarna); 3) (Sweden) Åke Jonsson (Maico)	1) (Belgium) Joël Robert (Suzuki); 2) (Belgium) Sylvain Geboers (Suzuki); 3) (Belgium) Roger De Coster (ČZ)
1971	1) (Belgium) Roger De Coster (Suzuki); 2) (Sweden) Åke Jonsson (Maico); 3) (Germany) Adolf Weil (Maico)	1) (Belgium) Joël Robert (Suzuki); 2) (Sweden) Håkan Andersson (Husqvarna); 3) (Belgium) Sylvain Geboers (Suzuki)
1972	1) (Belgium) Roger De Coster (Suzuki); 2) (East Germany) Paul Friedrichs (ČZ); 3) (Finland) Heikki Mikkola (Husqvarna)	1) (Belgium) Joël Robert (Suzuki); 2) (Sweden) Håkan Andersson (Yamaha); 3) (Belgium) Sylvain Geboers (Suzuki)
1973	1) (Belgium) Roger De Coster (Suzuki); 2) (Germany) Willy Bauer (Maico); 3) (Belgium) Jaak van Velthoven (Yamaha)	1) (Sweden) Håkan Andersson (Yamaha); 2) (Germany) Adolf Weil (Maico); 3) (Finland) Heikki Mikkola (Husqvarna)
1974	1) (Finland) Heikki Mikkola (Husqvarna); 2) (Belgium) Roger De Coster (Suzuki); 3) (Germany) Adolf Weil (Maico)	1) (Soviet Union) Guennady Moisseev (KTM); 2) (Czechoslovakia) Jaroslav Falta (ČZ); 3) (Belgium) Harry Everts (Puch)

Year	500cc	250cc	125cc
1975	1) (Belgium) Roger De Coster (Suzuki); 2) (Finland) Heikki Mikkola (Husqvarna); 3) (Netherlands) Gerrit Wolsink (Suzuki)	1) (Belgium) Harry Everts (Puch); 2) (Sweden) Håkan Andersson (Yamaha); 3) (Germany) Willy Bauer (Suzuki)	1) (Belgium) Gaston Rahier (Suzuki); 2) (Belgium) Gilbert de Roover (Zündapp); 3) (Czechoslovakia) Antonin Baborowsky (ČZ)
1976	1) (Belgium) Roger De Coster (Suzuki); 2) (Netherlands) Gerrit Wolsink (Suzuki); 3) (Germany) Adolf Weil (Maico)	1) (Finland) Heikki Mikkola (Husqvarna); 2) (Soviet Union) Guennady Moisseev (KTM); 3) (Soviet Union) Vladimir Kavinov (KTM)	1) (Belgium) Gaston Rahier (Suzuki); 2) (Czechoslovakia) Jiří Churavý (ČZ); 3) (Czechoslovakia) Zdeněk Velký (ČZ)
1977	1) (Finland) Heikki Mikkola (Yamaha); 2) (Belgium) Roger De Coster (Suzuki); 3) (Netherlands) Gerrit Wolsink (Suzuki)	1) (Soviet Union) Guennady Moisseev (KTM); 2) (Soviet Union) Vladimir Kavinov (KTM); 3) (Belgium) André Malherbe (KTM)	1) (Belgium) Gaston Rahier (Suzuki); 2) (Netherlands) Gérard Rond (Yamaha); 3) (Belgium) André Massant (Yamaha)
1978	1) (Finland) Heikki Mikkola (Yamaha); 2) (United States) Brad Lackey (Honda); 3) (Belgium) Roger De Coster (Suzuki)	1) (Soviet Union) Guennady Moisseev (KTM); 2) (Sweden) Torleif Hansen (Kawasaki); 3) (Germany) Hans Maisch (Maico)	1) (Japan) Akira Watanabe (Suzuki); 2) (Belgium) Gaston Rahier (Suzuki); 3) (Netherlands) Gérard Rond (Yamaha)
1979	1) (United Kingdom) Graham Noyce (Honda); 2) (Netherlands) Gerrit Wolsink (Suzuki); 3) (Belgium) André Malherbe (Honda)	1) (Sweden) Håkan Carlqvist (Husqvarna); 2) (United Kingdom) Neil Hudson (Maico); 3) (Soviet Union) Vladimir Kavinov (KTM)	1) (Belgium) Harry Everts (Suzuki); 2) (Japan) Akira Watanabe (Suzuki); 3) (Belgium) Gaston Rahier (Yamaha)
1980	1) (Belgium) André Malherbe (Honda); 2) (United States) Brad Lackey (Kawasaki); 3) (Sweden) Håkan Carlqvist (Yamaha)	1) (Belgium) Georges Jobé (Suzuki); 2) (Netherlands) Kees van der Ven (Maico); 3) (Bulgaria) Dimitar Ranguelov (Husqvarna)	1) (Belgium) Harry Everts (Suzuki); 2) (Italy) Michele Rinaldi (TGM); 3) (Belgium) Eric Geboers (Suzuki)
1981	1) (Belgium) André Malherbe (Honda); 2) (United Kingdom) Graham Noyce (Honda); 3) (Sweden) Håkan Carlqvist (Yamaha)	1) (United Kingdom) Neil Hudson (Yamaha); 2) (Belgium) Georges Jobé (Suzuki); 3) (Netherlands) Kees van der Ven (KTM)	1) (Belgium) Harry Everts (Suzuki); 2) (Belgium) Eric Geboers (Suzuki); 3) (Italy) Michele Rinaldi (Gilera)
1982	1) (United States) Brad Lackey (Suzuki); 2) (Belgium) André Vromans (Suzuki); 3) (United Kingdom) Neil Hudson (Yamaha)	1) (United States) Danny LaPorte (Yamaha); 2) (Belgium) Georges Jobé (Suzuki); 3) (Netherlands) Kees van der Ven (KTM)	1) (Belgium) Eric Geboers (Suzuki); 2) (Italy) Corrado Maddii (Gilera); 3) (Italy) Michele Rinaldi (Gilera)
1983	1) (Sweden) Håkan Carlqvist (Yamaha); 2) (Belgium) André Malherbe (Honda); 3) (United Kingdom) Graham Noyce (Honda)	1) (Belgium) Georges Jobé (Suzuki); 2) (United States) Danny LaPorte (Yamaha); 3) (Netherlands) Kees van der Ven (KTM)	1) (Belgium) Eric Geboers (Suzuki); 2) (Italy) Michele Rinaldi (Suzuki); 3) (United States) Jim Gibson (Yamaha)
1984	1) (Belgium) André Malherbe (Honda); 2) (Belgium) Georges Jobé (Kawasaki); 3) (United Kingdom) David Thorpe (Honda)	1) (Austria) Heinz Kinigadner (KTM); 2) (France) Jacky Vimond (Yamaha); 3) (United Kingdom) Jeremy Whatley (Suzuki)	1) (Italy) Michele Rinaldi (Suzuki); 2) (Italy) Corrado Maddii (Cagiva); 3) (Netherlands) Kees van der Ven (KTM)
1985	1) (United Kingdom) David Thorpe (Honda); 2) (Belgium) André Malherbe (Honda); 3) (Belgium) Eric Geboers (Honda)	1) (Austria) Heinz Kinigadner (KTM); 2) (France) Jacky Vimond (Yamaha); 3) (Netherlands) Gert-Jan van Doorn (Honda)	1) (Finland) Pekka Vehkonen (Cagiva); 2) (Netherlands) David Strijbos (Honda); 3) (Italy) Corrado Maddii (Cagiva)
1986	1) (United Kingdom) David Thorpe (Honda); 2) (Belgium) André Malherbe (Honda); 3) (Belgium) Eric Geboers (Honda)	1) (France) Jacky Vimond (Yamaha); 2) (Italy) Michele Rinaldi (Suzuki); 3) (Netherlands) Gert-Jan van Doorn (Honda)	1) (Netherlands) David Strijbos (Cagiva); 2) (Netherlands) John van den Berk (Yamaha); 3) (Italy) Massimo Contini (Cagiva)
1987	1) (Belgium) Georges Jobé (Honda); 2) (United Kingdom) Kurt Nicoll (Kawasaki); 3) (Netherlands) Kees van der Ven (KTM)	1) (Belgium) Eric Geboers (Honda); 2) (Finland) Pekka Vehkonen (Cagiva); 3) (Sweden) Jörgen Nilsson (Honda)	1) (Netherlands) John van den Berk (Yamaha); 2) (Netherlands) David Strijbos (Cagiva); 3) (France) Jean-Michel Bayle (Honda)
1988	1) (Belgium) Eric Geboers (Honda); 2) (United Kingdom) Kurt Nicoll (Kawasaki); 3) (United Kingdom) David Thorpe (Honda)	1) (Netherlands) John van den Berk (Yamaha); 2) (Finland) Pekka Vehkonen (Cagiva); 3) (United States) Rodney Smith (Suzuki)	1) (France) Jean-Michel Bayle (Honda); 2) (Netherlands) David Strijbos (Cagiva); 3) (Netherlands) Pedro Tragter (Honda)
1989	1) (United Kingdom) David Thorpe (Honda); 2) (Australia) Jeff Leisk (Honda); 3) (Belgium) Eric Geboers (Honda)	1) (France) Jean-Michel Bayle (Honda); 2) (Finland) Pekka Vehkonen (Yamaha); 3) (Netherlands) John van den Berk (Yamaha)	1) (United States) Trampas Parker (KTM); 2) (Italy) Alex Puzar (Suzuki); 3) (United States) Mike Healy (KTM)
1990	1) (Belgium) Eric Geboers (Honda); 2) (United Kingdom) Kurt Nicoll (KTM); 3) (Belgium) Dirk Geukens (Honda)	1) (Italy) Alex Puzar (Suzuki); 2) (Finland) Pekka Vehkonen (Yamaha); 3) (Netherlands) John van den Berk (Suzuki)	1) (United States) Donny Schmit (Suzuki); 2) (United States) Bobby Moore (KTM); 3) (Belgium) Stefan Everts (Suzuki)
1991	1) (Belgium) Georges Jobé (Honda); 2) (Belgium) Jacky Martens (KTM); 3) (Belgium) Dirk Geukens (Honda)	1) (United States) Trampas Parker (Honda); 2) (United States) Mike Healy (KTM); 3) (Italy) Alex Puzar (Suzuki)	1) (Belgium) Stefan Everts (Suzuki); 2) (United States) Bobby Moore (KTM); 3) (Netherlands) Pedro Tragter (Suzuki)
1992	1) (Belgium) Georges Jobé (Honda); 2) (United Kingdom) Kurt Nicoll (KTM); 3) (United States) Billy Liles (Honda)	1) (United States) Donny Schmit (Yamaha); 2) (United States) Bobby Moore (Yamaha); 3) (Netherlands) Edwin Evertsen (Kawasaki)	1) (South Africa) Greg Albertyn (Honda); 2) (Netherlands) David Strijbos (Honda); 3) (Netherlands) Pedro Tragter (Suzuki)
1993	1) (Belgium) Jacky Martens (Husqvarna); 2) (Sweden) Jörgen Nilsson (Honda); 3) (Belgium) Joël Smets (Husaberg)	1) (South Africa) Greg Albertyn (Honda); 2) (Belgium) Stefan Everts (Suzuki); 3) (United States) Donny Schmit (Yamaha)	1) (Netherlands) Pedro Tragter (Suzuki); 2) (France) Yves Demaria (Suzuki); 3) (Netherlands) David Strijbos (Honda)
1994	1) (Sweden) Marcus Hansson (Honda); 2) (Belgium) Jacky Martens (Husqvarna); 3) (Belgium) Joël Smets (Vertemati)	1) (South Africa) Greg Albertyn (Suzuki); 2) (Belgium) Stefan Everts (Kawasaki); 3) (France) Yves Demaria (Honda)	1) (United States) Bobby Moore (Yamaha); 2) (Italy) Alessio Chiodi (Honda); 3) (Netherlands) Pedro Tragter (Suzuki)
1995	1) (Belgium) Joël Smets (Husaberg); 2) (United States) Trampas Parker (KTM); 3) (New Zealand) Darryl King (Kawasaki)	1) (Belgium) Stefan Everts (Kawasaki); 2) (Belgium) Marnicq Bervoets (Suzuki); 3) (United States) Tallon Vohland (Kawasaki)	1) (Italy) Alex Puzar (Honda); 2) (Italy) Alessio Chiodi (Yamaha); 3) (France) Sébastien Tortelli (Kawasaki)
1996	1) (New Zealand) Shayne King (KTM); 2) (Belgium) Joël Smets (Husaberg); 3) (Sweden) Peter Johansson (Husqvarna)	1) (Belgium) Stefan Everts (Honda); 2) (Belgium) Marnicq Bervoets (Suzuki); 3) (United States) Tallon Vohland (Kawasaki)	1) (France) Sébastien Tortelli (Kawasaki); 2) (United Kingdom) Paul Malin (Yamaha); 3) (France) Frédéric Vialle (Yamaha)
1997	1) (Belgium) Joël Smets (Husaberg); 2) (New Zealand) Darryl King (Husqvarna); 3) (New Zealand) Shayne King (KTM)	1) (Belgium) Stefan Everts (Honda); 2) (Belgium) Marnicq Bervoets (Suzuki); 3) (Germany) Pit Beirer (Honda)	1) (Italy) Alessio Chiodi (Yamaha); 2) (Italy) Alex Puzar (TM); 3) (Italy) Claudio Federici (Husqvarna)
1998	1) (Belgium) Joël Smets (Husaberg); 2) (New Zealand) Darryl King (Husqvarna); 3) (Sweden) Peter Johansson (Yamaha)	1) (France) Sebastien Tortelli (Kawasaki); 2) (Belgium) Stefan Everts (Honda); 3) (Germany) Pit Beirer (Honda)	1) (Italy) Alessio Chiodi (Husqvarna); 2) (France) David Vuillemin (Yamaha); 3) (Italy) Alex Puzar (TM)
1999	1) (Italy) Andrea Bartolini (Yamaha); 2) (Sweden) Peter Johansson (KTM); 3) (Belgium) Joël Smets (Husaberg)	1) (France) Frédéric Bolley (Honda); 2) (Germany) Pit Beirer (Kawasaki); 3) (France) David Vuillemin (Yamaha)	1) (Italy) Alessio Chiodi (Husqvarna); 2) (Italy) Claudio Federici (Yamaha); 3) (United States) Mike Brown (Honda)
2000	1) (Belgium) Joël Smets (KTM); 2) (Belgium) Marnicq Bervoets (Yamaha); 3) (Sweden) Peter Johansson	1) (France) Frédéric Bolley (Honda); 2) (France) Mickaël Pichon (Suzuki); 3) (Germany) Pit Beirer (Kawasaki)	1) (South Africa) Grant Langston (KTM); 2) (United Kingdom) James Dobb; 3) (United States) Mike Brown
2001	1) (Belgium) Stefan Everts (Yamaha); 2) (Belgium) Joël Smets (KTM); 3) (Belgium) Marnicq Bervoets (Yamaha)	1) (France) Mickaël Pichon (Suzuki); 2) (Australia) Chad Reed (Kawasaki); 3) (Republic of Ireland) Gordon Crockard (Honda)	1) (United Kingdom) James Dobb (KTM); 2) (Belgium) Steve Ramon (Kawasaki); 3) (Netherlands) Erik Eggens (KTM)
2002	1) (Belgium) Stefan Everts (Yamaha); 2) (Belgium) Joël Smets (KTM); 3) (Spain) Javier Garcia Vico (KTM)	1) (France) Mickaël Pichon (Suzuki); 2) (New Zealand) Josh Coppins (Honda); 3) (Germany) Pit Beirer (Honda)	1) (France) Mickaël Maschio (Kawasaki); 2) (Belgium) Steve Ramon (KTM); 3) (Belgium) Patrick Caps (KTM)

Year	MotocrossGP	125cc	650cc
2003	1) (Belgium) Stefan Everts (Yamaha); 2) (Belgium) Joël Smets (KTM); 3) (France) Mickaël Pichon (Suzuki)	1) (Belgium) Steve Ramon (KTM); 2) (Belgium) Stefan Everts (Yamaha); 3) (Italy) Andrea Bartolini (Yamaha)	1) (Belgium) Joël Smets (KTM); 2) (Spain) Javier Garcia Vico (KTM); 3) (Belgium) Cedric Melotte (Honda)

Year	MX1	MX2	MX3
2004	1) (Belgium) Stefan Everts (Yamaha); 2) (France) Mickaël Pichon (Honda); 3) (New Zealand) Josh Coppins (Honda)	1) (New Zealand) Ben Townley (KTM); 2) (South Africa) Tyla Rattray (KTM); 3) (Italy) Tony Cairoli (Yamaha)	1) (France) Yves Demaria (KTM); 2) (Italy) Christian Beggi (Honda); 3) (Italy) Daniele Bricca (Honda)

Year	MX1	MX2	MX3	Women's MX
2005	1) (Belgium) Stefan Everts (Yamaha); 2) (New Zealand) Josh Coppins (Honda); 3) (New Zealand) Ben Townley (KTM)	1) (Italy) Tony Cairoli (Yamaha); 2) (Australia) Andrew McFarlane (Yamaha); 3) (Italy) Alessio Chiodi (Yamaha)	1) (Belgium) Sven Breugelmans (KTM); 2) (France) Yves Demaria (KTM); 3) (Switzerland) Julien Bill (KTM)	1) (Germany) Stephanie Laier (KTM); 2) (New Zealand) Katherine Prumm (Kawasaki); 3) (France) Livia Lancelot (Yamaha)
2006	1) (Belgium) Stefan Everts (Yamaha); 2) (Belgium) Kevin Strijbos (Suzuki); 3) (Belgium) Steve Ramon (Suzuki)	1) (France) Christophe Pourcel (Kawasaki); 2) (Italy) Tony Cairoli (Yamaha); 3) (Italy) David Philippaerts (KTM)	1) (France) Yves Demaria (KTM); 2) (Belgium) Sven Breugelmans (KTM); 3) (Italy) Christian Beggi (Honda)	1) (New Zealand) Katherine Prumm (Kawasaki); 2) (Germany) Stephanie Laier (KTM); 3) (France) Livia Lancelot (Yamaha)
2007	1) (Belgium) Steve Ramon (Suzuki); 2) (Belgium) Kevin Strijbos (Suzuki); 3) (New Zealand) Josh Coppins (Yamaha)	1) (Italy) Tony Cairoli (Yamaha); 2) (United Kingdom) Tommy Searle (KTM); 3) (France) Christophe Pourcel (Kawasaki)	1) (France) Yves Demaria (Yamaha); 2) (Belgium) Sven Breugelmans (KTM); 3) (Finland) Jussi-Pekka Vehvilainen (Honda)	1) (New Zealand) Katherine Prumm (Kawasaki); 2) (France) Livia Lancelot (Kawasaki); 3) (Germany) Maria Franke (Kawasaki)
2008	1) (Italy) David Philippaerts (Yamaha); 2) (Belgium) Steve Ramon (Suzuki); 3) (Belgium) Ken De Dycker (Suzuki)	1) (South Africa) Tyla Rattray (KTM); 2) (United Kingdom) Tommy Searle (KTM); 3) (France) Nicolas Aubin (Yamaha)	1) (Belgium) Sven Breugelmans (KTM); 2) (Italy) Christian Beggi (Honda); 3) (France) Christophe Martin (Husqvarna)	1) (France) Livia Lancelot (Kawasaki); 2) (Germany) Stephanie Laier (KTM); 3) (Germany) Maria Franke (Kawasaki)
2009	1) (Italy) Tony Cairoli (Yamaha); 2) (Germany) Max Nagl (KTM); 3) (Belgium) Clément Desalle (Honda)	1) (France) Marvin Musquin (KTM); 2) (Portugal) Rui Gonçalves (KTM); 3) (France) Gautier Paulin (Kawasaki)	1) (France) Pierre Renet (Suzuki); 2) (Italy) Alex Salvini (Husqvarna); 3) (Finland) Antti Pyrhonen (Honda)	1) (Germany) Stephanie Laier (KTM); 2) (Germany) Larissa Papenmeier (Suzuki); 3) (Republic of Ireland) Natalie Kane (KTM)
2010	1) (Italy) Tony Cairoli (KTM); 2) (Belgium) Clément Desalle (Suzuki); 3) (Italy) David Philippaerts (Yamaha)	1) (France) Marvin Musquin (KTM); 2) (Germany) Ken Roczen (Suzuki); 3) (France) Steven Frossard (Kawasaki)	1) (Spain) Carlos Campano (Yamaha); 2) (Italy) Alex Salvini (Husqvarna); 3) (Slovenia) Matevz Irt (Husqvarna)	1) (Germany) Stephanie Laier (KTM); 2) (France) Livia Lancelot (KTM); 3) (Germany) Larissa Papenmeier (Suzuki)
2011	1) (Italy) Tony Cairoli (KTM); 2) (France) Steven Frossard (Yamaha); 3) (Belgium) Clément Desalle (Suzuki)	1) (Germany) Ken Roczen (KTM); 2) (Netherlands) Jeffrey Herlings (KTM); 3) (United Kingdom) Tommy Searle (Kawasaki)	1) (Switzerland) Julien Bill (Honda); 2) (France) Milko Potisek (Honda); 3) (Czech Republic) Martin Michek (KTM)	1) (Germany) Stephanie Laier (KTM); 2) (Italy) Kiara Fontanesi (Yamaha); 3) (Germany) Larissa Papenmeier (KTM)
2012	1) (Italy) Tony Cairoli (KTM); 2) (Belgium) Clément Desalle (Suzuki); 3) (France) Gautier Paulin (Kawasaki)	1) (Netherlands) Jeffrey Herlings (KTM); 2) (United Kingdom) Tommy Searle (Kawasaki); 3) (Belgium) Jeremy Van Horebeek (KTM)	1) (Austria) Matthias Walkner (KTM); 2) (Czech Republic) Martin Michek (KTM); 3) (Austria) Günter Schmidinger (Honda)	1) (Italy) Kiara Fontanesi (Yamaha); 2) (Republic of Ireland) Natalie Kane (KTM); 3) (Netherlands) Britt van der Wekken (Honda)
2013	1) (Italy) Tony Cairoli (KTM); 2) (Belgium) Clément Desalle (Suzuki); 3) (Belgium) Ken De Dycker (KTM)	1) (Netherlands) Jeffrey Herlings (KTM); 2) (France) Jordi Tixier (KTM); 3) (Spain) José Butrón (KTM)	1) (Slovenia) Klemen Gerčar (Honda); 2) (Czech Republic) Martin Michek (KTM); 3) (Austria) Matthias Walkner (KTM)	1) (Italy) Kiara Fontanesi (Yamaha); 2) (Australia) Meghan Rutledge (Kawasaki); 3) (Germany) Stephanie Laier (Kawasaki)

Year	MXGP	MX2	Women's MX
2014	1) (Italy) Tony Cairoli (KTM); 2) (Belgium) Jeremy Van Horebeek (Yamaha); 3) (Belgium) Kevin Strijbos (Suzuki)	1) (France) Jordi Tixier (KTM); 2) (Netherlands) Jeffrey Herlings (KTM); 3) (France) Romain Febvre (Husqvarna)	1) (Italy) Kiara Fontanesi (Yamaha); 2) (Australia) Meghan Rutledge (Kawasaki); 3) (France) Livia Lancelot (Kawasaki)
2015	1) (France) Romain Febvre (Yamaha); 2) (France) Gautier Paulin (Honda); 3) (Russia) Evgeny Bobryshev (Honda)	1) (Slovenia) Tim Gajser (Honda); 2) (Latvia) Pauls Jonass (KTM); 3) (United Kingdom) Max Anstie (Kawasaki)	1) (Italy) Kiara Fontanesi (Yamaha); 2) (France) Livia Lancelot (Kawasaki); 3) (Netherlands) Nancy van de Ven (Yamaha)
2016	1) (Slovenia) Tim Gajser (Honda); 2) (Italy) Tony Cairoli (KTM); 3) (Germany) Max Nagl (Husqvarna)	1) (Netherlands) Jeffrey Herlings (KTM); 2) (Switzerland) Jeremy Seewer (Suzuki); 3) (France) Benoît Paturel (Yamaha)	1) (France) Livia Lancelot (Kawasaki); 2) (Netherlands) Nancy van de Ven (Yamaha); 3) (Germany) Larissa Papenmeier (Suzuki)
2017	1) (Italy) Tony Cairoli (KTM); 2) (Netherlands) Jeffrey Herlings (KTM); 3) (France) Gautier Paulin (Husqvarna)	1) (Latvia) Pauls Jonass (KTM); 2) (Switzerland) Jeremy Seewer (Suzuki); 3) (Denmark) Thomas Kjær Olsen (Husqvarna)	1) (Italy) Kiara Fontanesi (Yamaha); 2) (France) Livia Lancelot (Kawasaki); 3) (New Zealand) Courtney Duncan (Yamaha)
2018	1) (Netherlands) Jeffrey Herlings (KTM); 2) (Italy) Tony Cairoli (KTM); 3) (Belgium) Clément Desalle (Kawasaki)	1) (Spain) Jorge Prado (KTM); 2) (Latvia) Pauls Jonass (KTM); 3) (Denmark) Thomas Kjær Olsen (Husqvarna)	1) (Italy) Kiara Fontanesi (Yamaha); 2) (Netherlands) Nancy van de Ven (Yamaha); 3) (Germany) Larissa Papenmeier (Suzuki)
2019	1) (Slovenia) Tim Gajser (Honda); 2) (Switzerland) Jeremy Seewer (Yamaha); 3) (Netherlands) Glenn Coldenhoff (KTM)	1) (Spain) Jorge Prado (KTM); 2) (Denmark) Thomas Kjær Olsen (Husqvarna); 3) (Belgium) Jago Geerts (Yamaha)	1) (New Zealand) Courtney Duncan (Kawasaki); 2) (Netherlands) Nancy van de Ven (Yamaha); 3) (Germany) Larissa Papenmeier (Yamaha)
2020	1) (Slovenia) Tim Gajser (Honda); 2) (Switzerland) Jeremy Seewer (Yamaha); 3) (Italy) Tony Cairoli (KTM)	1) (France) Tom Vialle (KTM); 2) (Belgium) Jago Geerts (Yamaha); 3) (France) Maxime Renaux (Yamaha)	1) (New Zealand) Courtney Duncan (Kawasaki); 2) (Netherlands) Nancy van de Ven (Yamaha); 3) (Germany) Larissa Papenmeier (Yamaha)
2021	1) (Netherlands) Jeffrey Herlings (KTM); 2) (France) Romain Febvre (Kawasaki); 3) (Slovenia) Tim Gajser (Honda)	1) (France) Maxime Renaux (Yamaha); 2) (Belgium) Jago Geerts (Yamaha); 3) (France) Tom Vialle (KTM)	1) (New Zealand) Courtney Duncan (Kawasaki); 2) (Netherlands) Nancy van de Ven (Yamaha); 3) (Italy) Kiara Fontanesi (Gas Gas)
2022	1) (Slovenia) Tim Gajser (Honda); 2) (Switzerland) Jeremy Seewer (Yamaha); 3) (Spain) Jorge Prado (Gas Gas)	1) (France) Tom Vialle (KTM); 2) (Belgium) Jago Geerts (Yamaha); 3) (Germany) Simon Längenfelder (Gas Gas)	1) (Netherlands) Nancy van de Ven (Yamaha); 2) (Netherlands) Lynn Valk (Yamaha); 3) (Germany) Larissa Papenmeier (Yamaha)
2023	1) (Spain) Jorge Prado (Gas Gas); 2) (France) Romain Febvre (Kawasaki); 3) (Switzerland) Jeremy Seewer (Yamaha)	1) (Italy) Andrea Adamo (KTM); 2) (Belgium) Jago Geerts (Yamaha); 3) (Germany) Simon Längenfelder (Gas Gas)	1) (New Zealand) Courtney Duncan (Kawasaki); 2) (Spain) Daniela Guillén (Gas Gas); 3) (Netherlands) Lotte van Drunen (Kawasaki)
2024	1) (Spain) Jorge Prado (Gas Gas); 2) (Slovenia) Tim Gajser (Honda); 3) (Netherlands) Jeffrey Herlings (KTM)	1) (Netherlands) Kay de Wolf (Husqvarna); 2) (Belgium) Lucas Coenen (Husqvarna); 3) (Germany) Simon Längenfelder (Gas Gas)	1) (Netherlands) Lotte van Drunen (Yamaha); 2) (Spain) Daniela Guillén (Gas Gas); 3) (Italy) Kiara Fontanesi (Gas Gas)
2025	1) (France) Romain Febvre (Kawasaki); 2) (Belgium) Lucas Coenen (KTM); 3) (Netherlands) Glenn Coldenhoff (Fantic)	1) (Germany) Simon Längenfelder (KTM); 2) (Netherlands) Kay de Wolf (Husqvarna); 3) (Italy) Andrea Adamo (KTM)	1) (Netherlands) Lotte van Drunen (Yamaha); 2) (Italy) Kiara Fontanesi (Gas Gas); 3) (Spain) Daniela Guillén (Gas Gas)
2026	1) (Netherlands) Jeffrey Herlings (Honda); 2) (France) Romain Febvre (Kawasaki); 3) (Slovenia) Tim Gajser (Yamaha)	1) (Spain) Guillem Farrés (Triumph); 2) (South Africa) Camden McLellan (Triumph); 3) (Belgium) Sacha Coenen (KTM)	1) (Spain) Daniela Guillén (Gas Gas); 2) (Italy) Kiara Fontanesi (Gas Gas); 3) (Netherlands) Lotte van Drunen (Yamaha)

== World Championships by nationality ==
=== Summary ===
Updated to end of 2026 season.

Country	500cc / MX3	250cc / MX1 / MXGP	125cc / MX2	Women	Total
Belgium	24	18	10	0	52
France	4	9	10	2	25
Italy	1	9	8	6	24
Sweden	10	6	0	0	16
Netherlands	0	4	7	3	14
United Kingdom	6	1	1	0	8
New Zealand	1	0	1	6	8
Spain	1	2	3	1	7
United States	1	3	3	0	7
Germany	0	0	2	4	6
Slovenia	1	4	1	0	6
Finland	3	1	1	0	5
South Africa	0	2	3	0	5
Soviet Union	0	4	0	0	4
East Germany	3	0	0	0	3
Austria	1	2	0	0	3
Switzerland	1	0	0	0	1
Japan	0	0	1	0	1
Latvia	0	0	1	0	1

=== 500cc / MX3 ===
	Country	Championships
1	Belgium	24
2	Sweden	10
3	United Kingdom	6
4	France	4
5	East Germany; Finland	3
7	Austria; Italy; New Zealand; Spain; Slovenia; Switzerland; United States	1

=== 250cc / MX1 / MXGP ===
Updated to end of 2026 season.

	Country	Championships
1	Belgium	17
2	France	10
3	Italy	8
4	Sweden; Soviet Union; Slovenia	4
5	United States; Netherlands	3
6	Austria; South Africa; Spain	2
7	Finland; United Kingdom	1

=== 125cc / MX2 ===
Updated to end of 2026 season

	Country	Championships
1	Belgium; France	10
3	Italy	8
4	Netherlands	7
5	South Africa; United States; Spain	3
6	Germany	2
7	Finland; Japan; Latvia; New Zealand; Slovenia; United Kingdom	1

=== Women ===
	Country	Championships
1	New Zealand	6
2	Italy	6
3	Germany	4
4	Netherlands	3
5	France	2
6	Spain	1

Without the European Championships. Last updated: 23 September 2026.

== Riders statistics ==
=== World Championships ===
Updated to the end of the 2026 season.

Rider	Titles
(Belgium) Stefan Everts	10 (2 × 500cc, 3 × 250cc, 4 × MX1, 1 × 125cc)
(Italy) Tony Cairoli	9 (5 × MX1, 2 × MXGP, 2 × MX2)
(Netherlands) Jeffrey Herlings	6 (3 × MXGP, 3 × MX2)
(Belgium) Joël Robert	6 (6 × 250cc)
(Belgium) Roger De Coster	5 (5 × 500cc)
(Belgium) Joël Smets	5 (4 × 500cc, 1 × 650cc)
(Belgium) Georges Jobé	5 (3 × 500cc, 2 × 250cc)
(Belgium) Eric Geboers	5 (2 × 500cc, 1 × 250cc, 2 × 125cc)
(Slovenia) Tim Gajser	5 (4 × MXGP, 1 × MX2)
(Finland) Heikki Mikkola	4 (3 × 500cc, 1 × 250cc)
(Sweden) Torsten Hallman	4 (4 × 250cc)
(Belgium) Harry Everts	4 (1 × 250cc, 3 × 125cc)
(Spain) Jorge Prado	4 (2 x MXGP, 2 x MX2)
(East Germany) Paul Friedrichs (Belgium) André Malherbe (United Kingdom) David Thorpe	3 (3 × 500cc)
(France) Yves Demaria	3 (3 × MX3)
(Soviet Union) Guennady Moisseev	3 (3 × 250cc)
(South Africa) Greg Albertyn	3 (2 × 250cc, 1 × 125cc)
(Belgium) Gaston Rahier (Italy) Alessio Chiodi	3 (3 × 125cc)
(France) Romain Febvre	2 (2 × MXGP)
(Sweden) Bill Nilsson (Sweden) Sten Lundin (Sweden) Rolf Tibblin (United Kingdom) Jeff Smith (Sweden) Bengt Åberg	2 (2 × 500cc)
(Belgium) Sven Breugelmans	2 (2 × MX3 )
(Sweden) Håkan Carlqvist	2 (1 × 500cc, 1 × 250cc)
(Austria) Heinz Kinigadner (France) Frédéric Bolley (France) Mickaël Pichon	2 (2 × 250cc)
(Netherlands) John van den Berk (France) Jean-Michel Bayle (Italy) Alex Puzar (United States) Trampas Parker (United States) Donny Schmit (France) Sébastien Tortelli	2 (1 × 250cc, 1 × 125cc )
(Belgium) Steve Ramon	2 (1 × MX1, 1 × 125cc)
(France) Marvin Musquin (France) Tom Vialle	2 (2 × MX2)
(Belgium) René Baeten (United Kingdom) Graham Noyce (United States) Brad Lackey (Belgium) Jacky Martens (Sweden) Marcus Hansson (New Zealand) Shayne King (Italy) Andrea Bartolini	1 (1 × 500cc)
(France) Pierre Renet (Spain) Carlos Campano (Switzerland) Julien Bill (Austria) Matthias Walkner (Slovenia) Klemen Gerčar	1 (1 × MX3)
(Soviet Union) Victor Arbekov (Sweden) Håkan Andersson (United Kingdom) Neil Hudson (United States) Danny LaPorte (France) Jacky Vimond	1 (1 × 250cc)
(Italy) David Philippaerts	1 (1 × MX1)
(Japan) Akira Watanabe (Italy) Michele Rinaldi (Finland) Pekka Vehkonen (Netherlands) Dave Strijbos (Netherlands) Pedro Tragter (United States) Bob Moore (South Africa) Grant Langston (United Kingdom) James Dobb (France) Mickaël Maschio	1 (1 × 125cc)
(New Zealand) Ben Townley (France) Christophe Pourcel (South Africa) Tyla Rattray (Germany) Ken Roczen (France) Jordi Tixier (Latvia) Pauls Jonass (France) Maxime Renaux (Italy) Andrea Adamo (Netherlands) Kay de Wolf (Germany) Simon Längenfelder (Spain) Guillem Farrés	1 (1 × MX2)

== All-time GP wins list ==
Only the victories in the GPs are considered, this result is given by the sum of the results of the single races, when the GP is disputed over two races.

Updated to September 20 2026

Riders who’ve competed in the 2026 FIM Motocross World Championship

#	Rider	500cc (1952–2002) 650cc (2003) MX1 (2004–2013) MXGP (2014–Present)	250cc (1957–2002) MotocrossGP (2003) MX2 (2004–Present)	125cc (1975–2003) MX3 (2004–2013)	Wins
1	(Netherlands) Jeffrey Herlings	64	61	–	125
2	(Belgium) Stefan Everts	42	46	13	101
3	(Italy) Tony Cairoli	70	24	–	94
4	(Belgium) Joël Smets	57	–	–	57
5	(Slovenia) Tim Gajser	47	5	–	52
6	(Belgium) Joël Robert	–	50	–	50
7	(Spain) Jorge Prado	18	31	–	49
8	(Belgium) André Malherbe	27	1	11	39
9	(Belgium) Eric Geboers	16	5	18	39
10	(France) Mickaël Pichon	8	27	3	38
11	(France) Yves Demaria	2	11	24	37
12	(Sweden) Torsten Hallman	-	37	–	37
13	(Belgium) Roger De Coster	36	–	–	36
14	(Finland) Heikki Mikkola	25	8	–	33
15	(Belgium) Georges Jobé	13	17	-	30
16	(England) Jeff Smith	23	7	-	30
17	(Belgium) Gaston Rahier	-	1	29	30
18	(Sweden) Rolf Tibblin	22	7	-	29
19	(Germany) Paul Friedrichs	27	1	-	28
20	(Netherlands) David Strijbos	-	1	26	27
21	(Italy) Alessio Chiodi	-	1	26	27
22	(France) Romain Febvre	25	1	-	26
23	(Belgium) Harry Everts	-	9	17	26
24	(France) Tom Vialle	1	24	-	25
25	(Sweden) Sten Lundin	25	-	-	25
26	(Belgium) Jago Geerts	-	24	-	24
27	(Belgium) Clement Desalle	23	-	-	23
28	(Italy) Alex Puzar	-	11	12	23
29	(England) David Thorpe	22	-	-	22
30	(France) Sébastien Tortelli	-	9	12	21
31	(Sweden) Håkan Carlqvist	15	6	-	21
32	(Belgium) Lucas Coenen	11	10	-	21
33	(Belgium) Marnicq Bervoets	4	15	-	19
34	(Sweden) Bill Nilsson	18	-	-	18
35	(England) Dave Bickers	2	16	-	18
36	(Netherlands) Kees van der Ven	4	10	4	18
37	(Finland) Pekka Vehkonen	-	12	5	17
38	(Belgium) Jacky Martens	16	1	-	17
39	(Netherlands) Kay de Wolf	-	15	-	15
40	(France) Jean-Michel Bayle	2	6	7	15
41	(South Africa) Tyla Rattray	-	15	-	15
42	(United States) Donny Schmit	-	8	7	15
43	(Italy) Andrea Bartolini	8	3	4	15
44	(Netherlands) Gerrit Wolsink	15	-	-	15
45	(France) Marvin Musquin	-	14	-	14
46	(New Zealand) Ben Townley	4	9	1	14
47	(England) Tommy Searle	-	14	-	14
48	(Belgium) Sylvain Geboers	-	14	-	14
49	(Switzerland) Jeremy Seewer	8	5	-	13
50	(Italy) Michele Rinaldi	-	1	12	13
51	(England) Kurt Nicoll	11	2	-	13

== Active GP rider wins list ==
Updated to September 20, 2026.

#	Rider	MXGP	MX2	Wins
1	(Netherlands) Jeffrey Herlings	64	61	125
2	(Slovenia) Tim Gajser	47	5	52
3	(France) Romain Febvre	25	1	26
4	(France) Tom Vialle	1	24	25
5	(Belgium) Jago Geerts	-	24	24
6	(Belgium) Lucas Coenen	11	10	21
7	(Netherlands) Kay de Wolf	-	15	15
8	(Switzerland) Jeremy Seewer	8	5	13
9	(Latvia) Pauls Jonass	1	11	12
10	(Germany) Simon Längenfelder	-	12	12
11	(France) Maxime Renaux	3	6	9
12	(Belgium) Sacha Coenen	-	8	8
13	(Italy) Andrea Adamo	-	6	6
14	(Belgium) Liam Everts	-	6	6
15	(Spain) Guillem Farrés	-	6	6
16	(South Africa) Camden McLellan	-	5	5
17	(France) Thibault Benistant	-	3	3
18	(Netherlands) Calvin Vlaanderen	1	1	2
19	(Italy) Mattia Guadagnini	-	2	2
20	(United Kingdom) Ben Watson	-	2	2
21	(Spain) Rubén Fernández	1	-	1
22	(France) Mathis Valin	-	1	1

== Medal table ==
=== Medal table MX ===
Rank	Nation	Gold	Silver	Bronze	Total
1	Belgium	52	48	33	133
2	France	23	13	17	53
3	Italy	18	17	15	50
4	Sweden	16	18	17	51
5	Netherlands	10	12	21	43
6	Great Britain	8	15	13	36
7	United States	7	8	9	24
8	Spain	7	3	3	13
9	Slovenia	6	2	2	10
10	Finland	5	5	4	14
11	South Africa	5	1	0	6
12	Soviet Union	4	2	4	10
13	East Germany	3	2	1	6
14	Austria	3	0	2	5
15	New Zealand	2	4	5	11
16	Germany	1	5	13	19
17	Switzerland	1	5	2	8
18	Latvia	1	2	0	3
19	Japan	1	1	0	2
20	Czechoslovakia	0	3	3	6
21	Australia	0	3	0	3
22	Czech Republic	0	2	1	3
23	Denmark	0	1	2	3
24	Portugal	0	1	0	1
25	Bulgaria	0	0	1	1
25	Ireland	0	0	1	1
25	Russia	0	0	1	1
Totals (27 entries)		173	173	170	516

Last updated: 24 August 2025.

=== Medal table WMX ===
Rank	Nation	Gold	Silver	Bronze	Total
1	Italy	6	1	1	8
2	New Zealand	5	2	1	8
3	Germany	4	3	10	17
4	Netherlands	2	5	2	9
5	France	2	4	3	9
6	Australia	0	2	0	2
7	Ireland	0	1	1	2
Totals (7 entries)		19	18	18	55

Last updated: 4 September 2022.

== Grand Prix Nations ==
Countries that have held Grand Prix as of the 2026 season. Countries in bold currently hold a Grand Prix.

- **Argentina**
- **Australia**
- Austria
- **Belgium**
- Brazil
- Bulgaria
- Canada
- Chile
- **China**
- Croatia
- **Czech Republic**
- Denmark
- Finland
- **France**
- **Germany**
- Greece
- Guatemala
- Hungary
- Indonesia
- (Republic of Ireland) Ireland
- **Italy**
- **Latvia**
- Japan
- Luxembourg
- Mexico
- **Netherlands**
- Poland
- **Portugal**
- Qatar
- Romania
- Russia
- San Marino
- Slovakia
- Slovenia
- **South Africa**
- **Spain**
- **Sweden**
- **Switzerland**
- Thailand
- **Turkey**
- Ukraine
- **United Kingdom**
- United States
- Venezuela

== See also ==
- FIM Women's Motocross World Championship
- List of AMA motocross national champions
- Australian Motocross Championship
- British Motocross Championship
- FIM Supercross World Championship
- FIM Veteran Motocross World Cup
- List of Trans-AMA motocross champions
- List of motocross riders
- Hawkstone Park Motocross Circuit
