= Alessio Chiodi =

Italian motorcycle racer (born 1973)

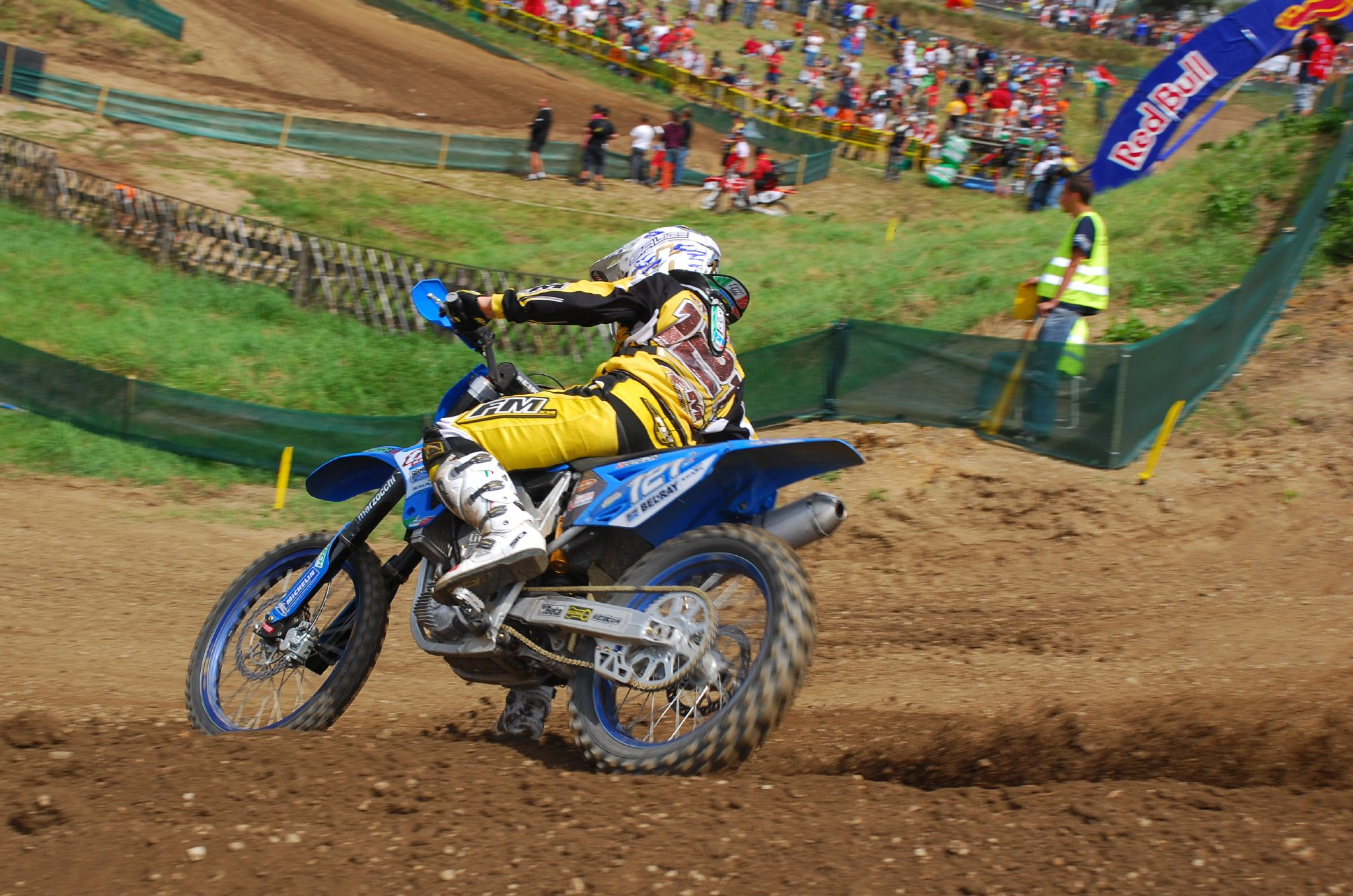
- Nationality: Italian
- Born: 17 March 1973 (age 53) Salò, Italy

Motocross career
- Years active: 1993 - 2009
- Teams: Yamaha, Husqvarna
- Championships: 125cc - 1997, 1998, 1999
- Wins: 27

Alessio Chiodi (born 17 March 1973 in Salò) is an Italian former professional motocross racer. He competed in the Motocross World Championships from 1993 to 2009. Chiodi is notable for winning three consecutive FIM 125cc motocross world championships.

== Biography ==
In 1993 Chiodi finished eighth in the 125cc motocross world championship. The following year, he improved to second in the 125cc motocross world championship, 48 points behind Bobby Moore. He repeated his second place result in the 1995 125cc motocross world championship, this time by only three points to fellow Italian Alessandro Puzar.

Chiodi moved to the 250cc motocross world championship for the 1996 season where he finished the season in 16th place. He returned to the 125cc motocross world championship in 1997, where he once again battled Puzar for the title. The world championship was not decided until the final race of the season when Chiodi won the championship by 40 points over Puzar.

The following year, Chiodi switched to the Husqvarna factory racing team and repeated as 125cc world champion. In 1999, Chiodi won his third consecutive 125cc world championship, also on a Husqvarna.

Chiodi moved to the United States in 2000 to compete in the AMA national championships without success due to an injury plagued season. Afterwards, he returned to Europe to compete in the world championships before switching to the four-stroke world championships. Chiodi was a member of the winning Italian teams in the 1999 and 2002 Motocross des Nations.
