= Bobby Moore (motorcyclist) =

American motorcycle racer

- Nationality: American

Motocross career
- Years active: 1980 – 1995
- Teams: KTM, Yamaha
- Championships: 125cc - 1994
- Wins: 13

Bobby Moore is an American former professional motocross racer. He won the 1994 125cc Motocross World Championship. Moore was inducted into the AMA Motorcycle Hall of Fame in 2017.

In 1985, Moore won the A.M.A. 125cc Western Supercross title. He moved on to the F.I.M. world championships, finishing second to Donny Schmit in the 1990 125cc championship and second to Stefan Everts in the 1991 125cc championship. In 1992, he again finished second to Schmit, this time in the 250cc world championship. He moved back to the 125cc class, and in 1994, he won the world championship on a Yamaha.
