= Pekka Vehkonen =

Finnish motorcycle racer

- Nationality: Finnish
- Born: 27 May 1964 (age 62) Helsinki, Finland

Motocross career
- Years active: 1982 - 1993
- Teams: Cagiva
- Championships: 125cc - 1985
- Wins: 17

Pekka Vehkonen (born 27 May 1964 in Helsinki) is a Finnish former professional motocross racer. He competed in the Motocross World Championships from 1982 to 1993. Vehkonen is notable for winning the 1985 FIM 125cc motocross world championship.

== Biography ==
Vehkonen won the Finnish 125cc national championship in 1980. He moved up the world championships in 1982 and in 1985, he won the FIM world championship in the 125cc class, while riding for the Cagiva factory racing team. Vehkonen moved up to the 250cc world championship, where he finished in second place for four years in succession between 1987 and 1990. Vehkonen retired from competition in 1993. He is the nephew of former professional motocross racer, Kalevi Vehkonen.
