= Jacky Martens =

Belgian motorcycle racer

- Nationality: Belgian
- Born: 3 July 1963 (age 63) Lommel, Belgium

Motocross career
- Years active: 1982–1998
- Teams: Husqvarna, KTM
- Championships: 500cc – 1993
- Wins: 17

Jacky Martens (born 3 July 1963) is a Belgian former professional motocross racer and current race team manager. He competed in the Motocross World Championships from 1982 to 1998. Martens is notable for winning the 1993 F.I.M. 500cc motocross world championship.

== Racing career ==
Born in Lommel, Belgium, Martens' first motocross race was in 1979, and by the mid 1980s, he made the breakthrough into Grand Prix motocross, originally on a privately entered Honda, before a switch to the KTM factory racing team, culminating in a best result of second in the 500cc motocross world championship in 1991.

For 1992, Martens switched to the Husqvarna factory team, riding the fearsome Husqvarna 610 four-stroke machine. Many felt this was a backward step for Martens, as unlike today, four-stroke machines were seen as slow, bulky and uncompetitive compared to the two-stroke machines. At times, Martens had a difficult 1992, but some encouraging results later in the year saw him finish 11th in the series.

However, 1993 was a different start. After a steady start to the series at the Hawkstone Park Motocross Circuit, Martens quickly proved himself and his machine, rising to the top of the 500cc world championship standings, with Swede Jorgen Nilsson. The championship was contested until the very final round, where Martens clinched the title to become the first rider to win the premier 500cc class on a four-stroke since Jeff Smith accomplished the feat in 1965.

1994 saw Martens once again challenge for the title, his main rival being another Swede, Marcus Hansson. Once again the title was decided on the very final round, but a fall in the final round cost Martens the title, as he narrowly took second overall.

1995 and 1996 were blighted by injury, and Martens' final season as a rider was in 1997. By this time, Martens was seen as something of an also-ran, but he managed to upset the form book and produce some impressive results, including a moto win at the British Grand Prix at Hawkstone Park, which was popular with Martens' large contingent of British fans.

== Post-racing career ==
After retiring, Martens became the team manager for the JM Racing KTM team, helping to guide Sven Breugelmans to the MX3 world championship. He managed the Husqvarna factory racing team in the MX2 class from 2014 to 2019. In 2020, Martens started the JM Honda Racing team to compete in the MXGP class.
