= John van den Berk =

Dutch motorcycle racer (born 1967)

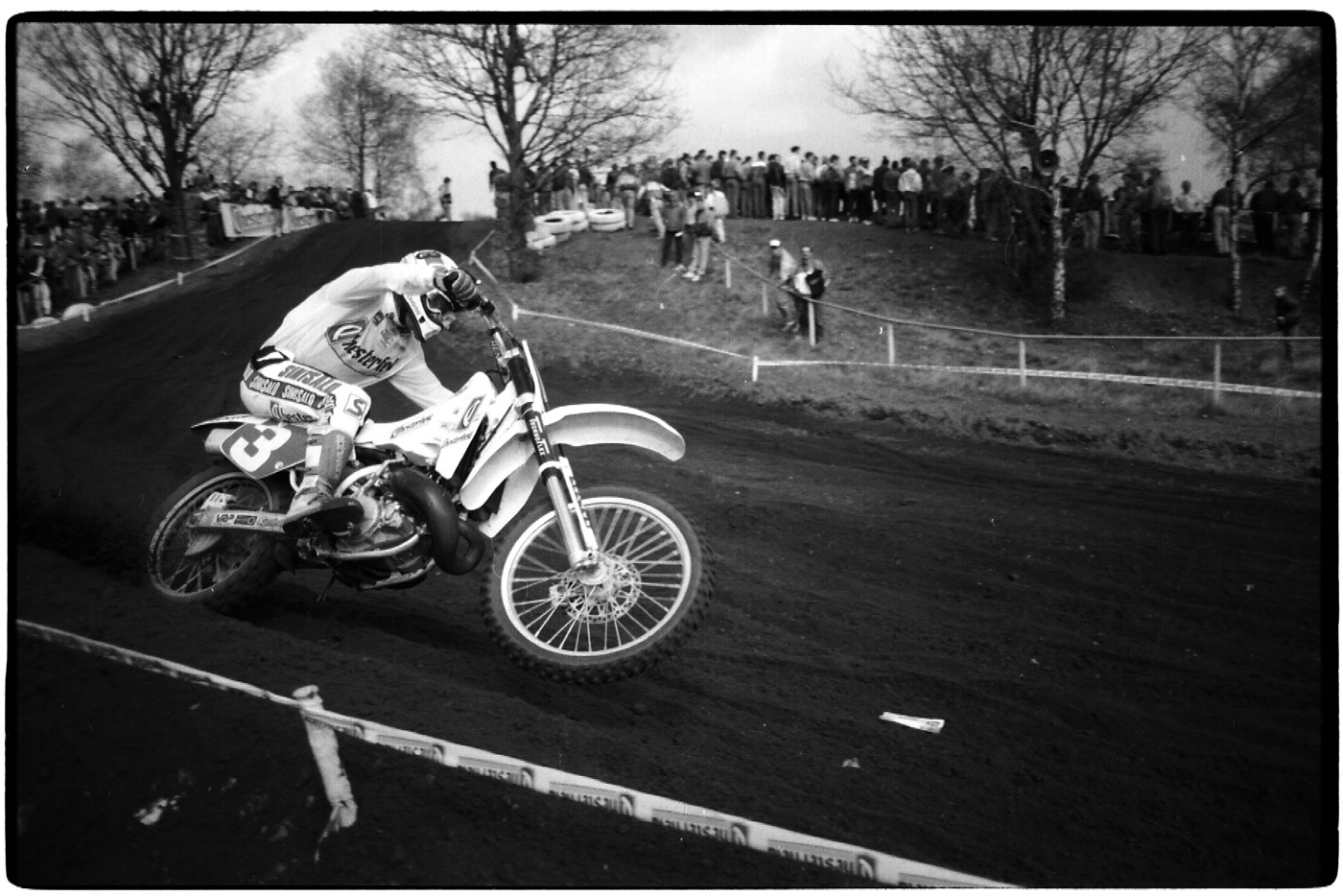
- Nationality: Dutch
- Born: 1967 (age 58–59) Oss, Netherlands

Motocross career
- Years active: 1984 - 1995
- Teams: Yamaha
- Championships: 125cc - 1987; 250cc - 1988
- Wins: 6

John van den Berk (born 1967 in Oss) is a Dutch former professional motocross racer and riding instructor. He competed in the Motocross World Championships from 1984 to 1995. Van den Berk is notable for being a two-time FIM motocross world champion.

== Biography ==
Van der Berk was the 1987 FIM 125cc motocross world champion riding a Yamaha. The following year, he moved to the 250cc class where he again won the world championship, also on a Yamaha. Currently, he is the head coach of the Royal Dutch Motorcyclist Federation, and is the organizer of various motocross training courses in Europe.
