= Ivan Miller (motocross rider) =

Motocross rider

- Nationality: New Zealander
- Born: 4 September 1949 (age 77) Blenheim, New Zealand

Motocross career
- Years active: 1964 - 1983

Ivan Miller
Career history
- 1972: Rayleigh Rockets

Ivan Miller (born 4 September 1949) is a former professional motocross and motorcycle speedway rider from New Zealand. He competed in motocross events from 1964 until 1983.

== Motocross racing career ==
Miller was born in Blenheim, New Zealand. He began competing in motocross in 1964 at the age of 15. He won his first New Zealand championship titles during the 1967/68 season in the 250cc and 350cc classes. Miller moved to Australia to race and then to England in 1969. While riding in England he received support from Comerfords to ride Bultacos and later KTMs. In 1971, he won two Australian championships in the 500cc and unlimited classes. He finished third in the British 250cc championship in 1974. The following year, he was a member of the British teams that competed in the Motocross des Nations and the Trophée des Nations. In the late 1970s and early 1980s, Miller continued to achieve success in the UK, Australia and New Zealand. He was the 1976/77 New Zealand A grade champion, and he won the open class in 1977/78, 1979/80 and 1980/81 riding Suzukis. He also competed in the Trans-AMA series in the United States and Canada and he rode for the Rayleigh Rockets speedway team in 1972.

Miller rode one season of speedway in the United Kingdom, racing for Rayleigh Rockets in 1972.
