= Alex Puzar =

Italian motorcycle racer (born 1968)

- Nationality: Italian
- Born: 19 November 1968 (age 57)

Motocross career
- Years active: 1988–2009
- Teams: KTM, Suzuki
- Championships: 2 (250cc - 1990; 125cc - 1995)
- Wins: 23

Alessandro "Alex" Puzar (born 19 November 1968) is an Italian former professional motocross racer. He competed in the Motocross World Championships from 1988 to 2009. Puzar is notable for being a two-time motocross world champion.

== Biography ==
Puzar began his motocross Grand Prix career in 1988 riding a KTM. He was the 1990 F.I.M. world champion in the 250cc class on a Suzuki. In 1995, he won the 125cc motocross world championship on a Honda. Along with Andrea Bartolini and Alessio Chiodi, Puzar was a member of the winning Italian team in the 2002 Motocross des Nations.
