= Paal, Belgium =

Paal
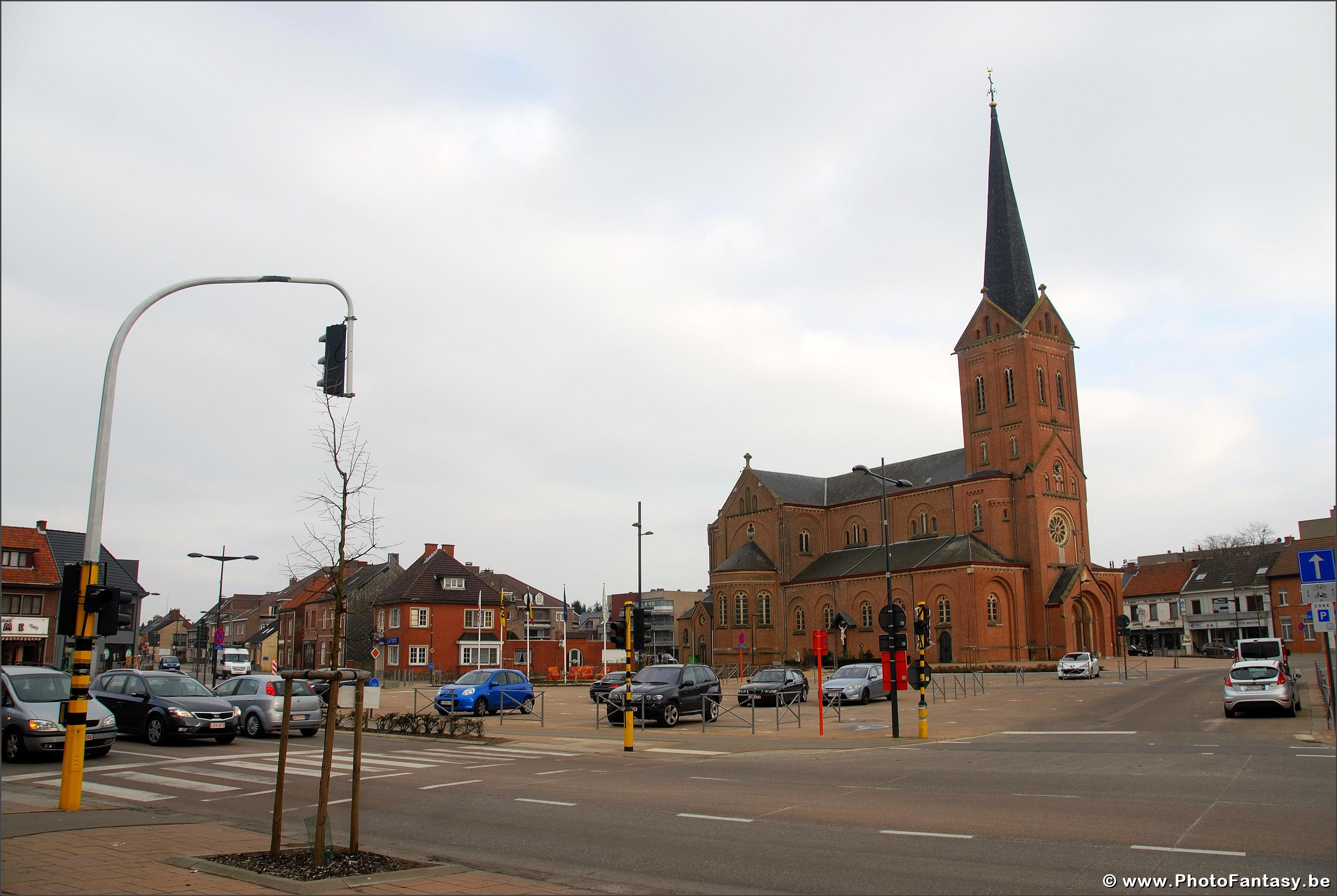
- Nickname: De Buiting
- Location in Belgium
- Coordinates: 51°02′21″N 5°10′22″E
- Country: Belgium
- Region: Flanders
- Community: Flemish Community
- Province: Limburg
- Arrondissement: Hasselt
- Municipality: Beringen

Area
  - Total: 23.57 km^{2} (9.10 sq mi)

Population (2021)
  - Total: 12,083
  - Density: 512.6/km^{2} (1,328/sq mi)
- Time zone: UTC+1 (CET)
  - Summer (DST): UTC+2 (CEST)
- Postal Code: 3583
- Area code: 011 - 013
- Website: http://www.paalonline.be/

Paal (Limburgish: Poël) is a town and borough in the municipality of Beringen, in the Belgian Limburg Campine. Once known as Pael, the town has a long history.

The town plays an important role in both the industry and tourism of Beringen. The town has a recreational area, the "Paalse Plas", with ponds, a sailing lake and a golf course.

The annual Paal op Stelten music festival attracts 20,000 visitors to the town each August.

The industrial area along the A13 motorway houses the facilities of a number of multinational companies.

The studio of Radio Benelux, the local radio station for Beringen and surroundings, is located in Paal.

== Population timeline ==
Historical population

Year	Pop.	±%
1806	1,497	—
1816	1,513	+1.1%
1830	1,852	+22.4%
1846	2,214	+19.5%
1856	2,427	+9.6%
1866	2,215	−8.7%
1876	2,255	+1.8%

Year	Pop.	±%
1880	2,295	+1.8%
1890	2,340	+2.0%
1900	2,442	+4.4%
1910	2,934	+20.1%
1920	3,298	+12.4%
1930	3,973	+20.5%
1947	4,765	+19.9%

Year	Pop.	±%
1961	5,817	+22.1%
1970	7,183	+23.5%
1976	7,799	+8.6%
1991	9,416	+20.7%
2001	10,198	+8.3%
2006	10,658	+4.5%

Source: NIS and www.limburg.be, City Beringen. Note: 1806 to 2001 = census; 1976 = population at 31 December 2006 = population at 1 January

== Gallery ==
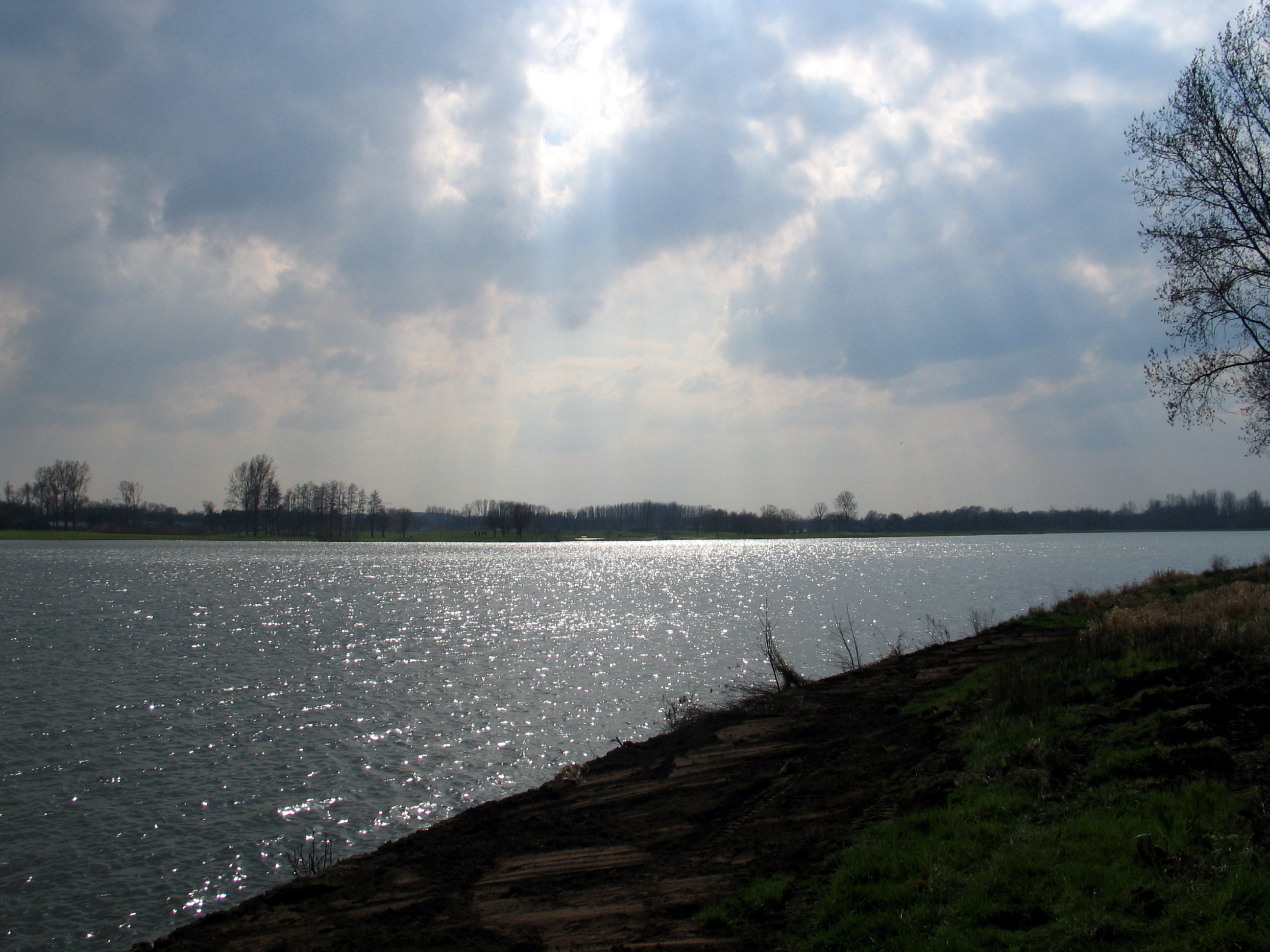
Paalse plas

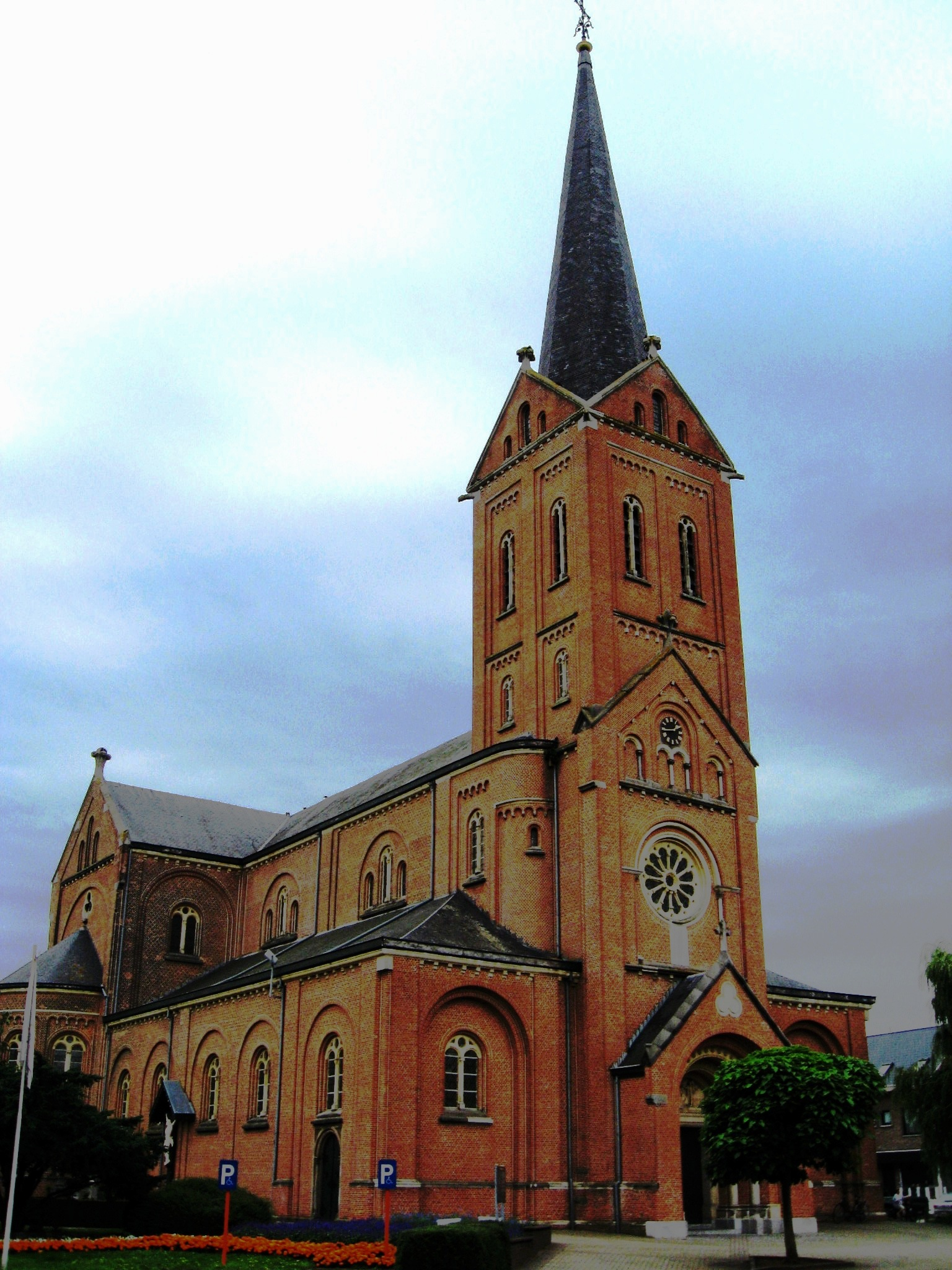
The Saint John the Baptist church in the town centre
