= Stefan Everts =

Belgian motorcycle racer

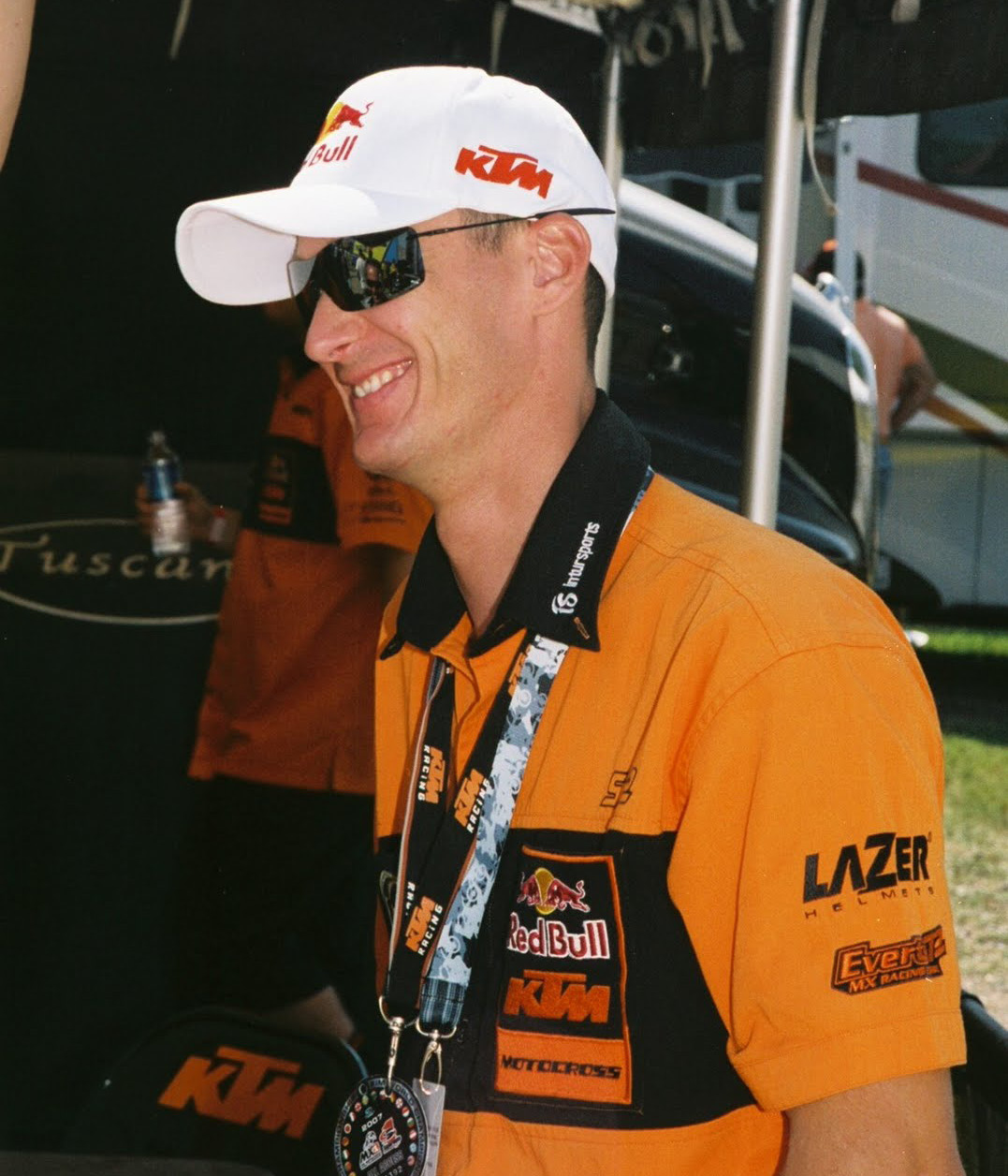
- Everts in 2008
- Nationality: Belgian
- Born: 25 November 1972 (age 53) Neeroeteren, Belgium

Motocross career
- Years active: 1988 - 2006
- Teams: Suzuki, Honda, Yamaha, Kawasaki, Husqvarna
- Championships: 125cc- 1991; 250cc- 1995, 1996, 1997; 500cc- 2001, 2002 •MX1: 2003, 2004, 2005, 2006
- Wins: 101
- First GP win: 1991, GP of Hungary, 125cc

Stefan Everts (born 25 November 1972) is a Belgian former professional motocross racer and racing team manager. He competed in the Motocross World Championships from 1988 to 2006. Everts is notable for winning a record 10 FIM motocross world championships and 101 motocross Grand Prix race victories, making him the most successful competitor in the history of the Motocross World Championships. In 2003, Everts was named the recipient of the Belgian National Sports Merit Award.

== Biography ==
Everts was born in Neeroeteren, a sub-municipality of Maaseik, Belgium as the son of four-time motocross world champion, Harry Everts. He began riding motorcycles at the age of four. At the age of 17, he made his debut in the 125cc World Championship, and two years later he secured his first title in that division. During the following years, the Belgian moved up through the different divisions and collected an as yet unsurpassed number of World Championship titles (10) and GP victories (101).

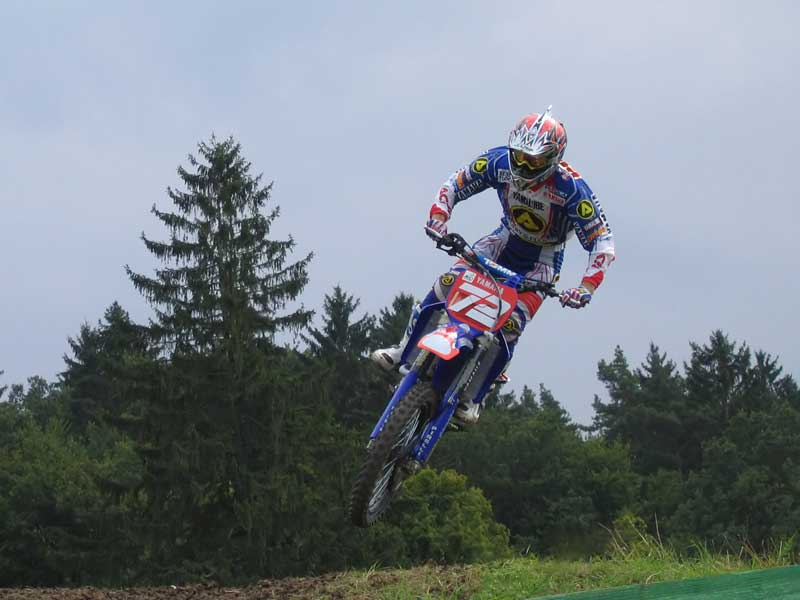
Stefan Everts during the 2005 World Championships

Everts was known for his very smooth style on the bike, making his riding look effortless. In particular, he maintained a standing position on the bike much more frequently than other riders, even in very tight corners. His cornering control was unique and he was noted for running his engine in a higher gear to torque his way around the track, as opposed to revving it out hard in each gear, even on the 125cc and 250cc two-stroke machines he used at the beginning of his career. While he never placed much focus on American-style supercross tracks or riding styles, he nevertheless proved to be competitive with top US riders even at their own game. In the later stages of his career, Everts' vast experience helped him to reach an impressive consistency, making erratic movements or mistakes very rare, as illustrated by the fourteen-to-one win–loss record in his final season.

After ending his active riding career at the end of 2006, Everts became motocross race director for the KTM factory team, ultimately responsible for coaching their riders on the technical, mental and physical level. In July 2007, he renewed his contract with the Austrian manufacturer for another two years. Most of the time, he lives in Monaco (a move for which he was criticized very much like fellow Belgian sports personalities Justine Henin and Tom Boonen), together with his wife Kelly and his son Liam.

In 2007, Everts was racing in the biggest enduro competition in the world Gotland Grand National in Sweden, but he did not finish because his radiators became full of mud and the bike became overheated. In 2008, he was once again one of the riders in Gotland Grand National, but he crashed in the end of the race and didn't finish.

== Consequences of malaria ==
At the beginning of December 2018, Everts was admitted to the intensive care unit of UZ Leuven in a critical condition. The previous month, he had been bitten by the malaria mosquito while in the Democratic Republic of the Congo. Everts had been visiting Lubumbashi to participate in a motocross charity event to benefit local children, 4 Hours of Lubumbashi. On 17 December, Everts woke up from an induced coma. In late December 2018, Everts was allowed to begin his physical rehabilitation. His treating team expected that neither his brain nor his organs would be damaged by the effects of malaria he had suffered. His life had been hanging by a thread, according to professors at UZ Leuven hospital. Everts considered being alive at Christmas 2018 as his best Christmas present.

However, Everts partially recovered from the disease after a series of surgeries that resulted in the loss of eight toes. Nevertheless, he managed to walk again.

== Records and awards ==
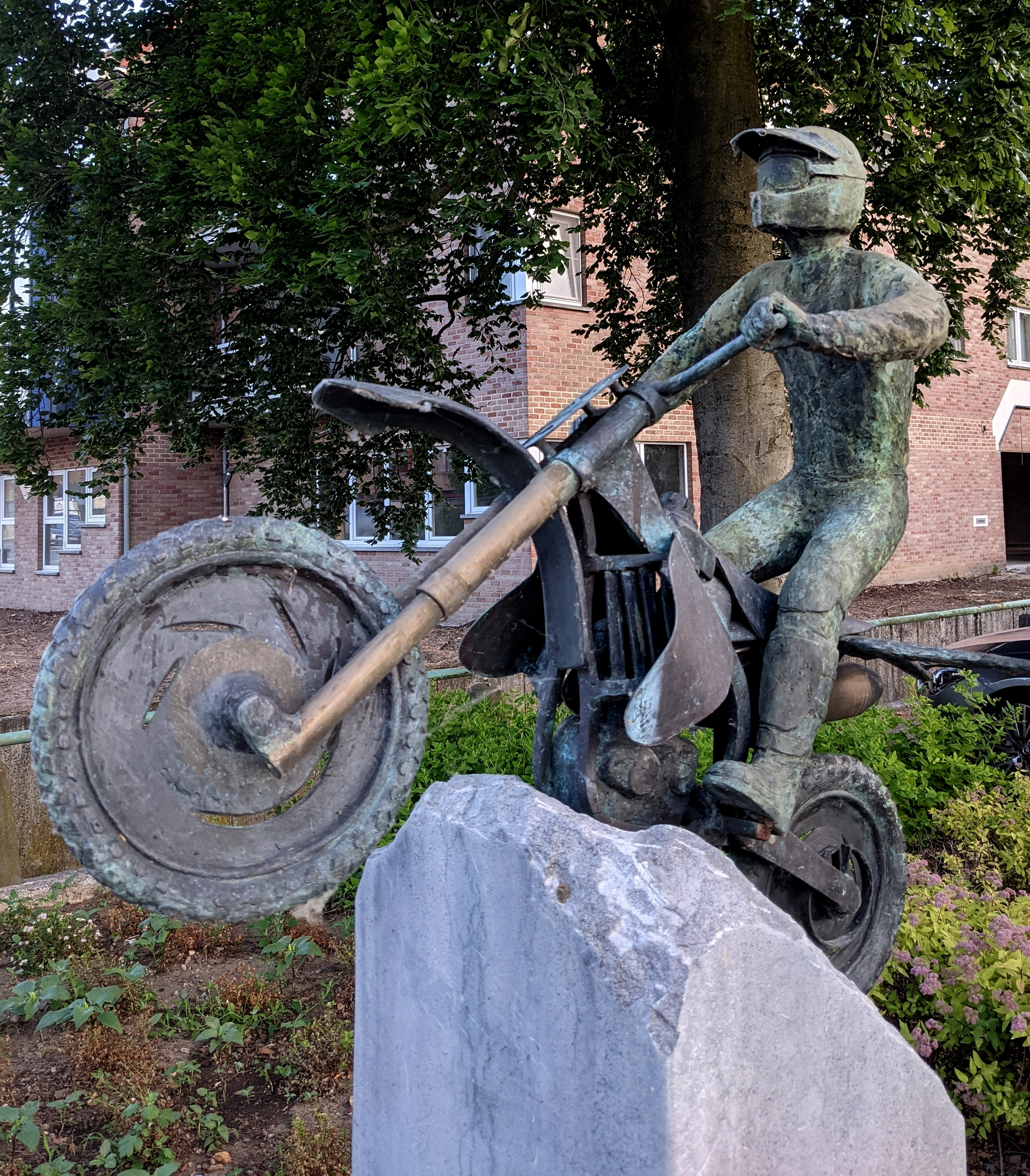
Statue of Stefan Everts in Maaseik

=== Records ===
- 10 times World Champion
- 14 out of 15 GPs won in the 2006 season
- Second man, after Eric Geboers, to become "Mr. 875cc" (winning world titles in 125/250/500cc)
- In the 2003 season, he won 3 GPs (125cc, MXGP and 650cc) on the same day in Ernee, France.
- Only rider to become World Champion on all four Japanese manufacturers (Suzuki, Kawasaki, Honda and Yamaha).

=== Awards and honours ===
- Flemish Sportsjewel (Vlaams Sportjuweel): 1997
- Belgian Sportsman of the year: 2001, 2002, 2003, 2004 and 2006 (5x, only surpassed by Eddy Merckx, tied with Remco Evenepoel)
- Belgian National Sports Merit Award: 2003
- Lifetime Achievement award: 2006
- Statue in Neeroeteren, Maaseik: 2006
- USGP Legends & Heroes Award: 2011

== Career ==
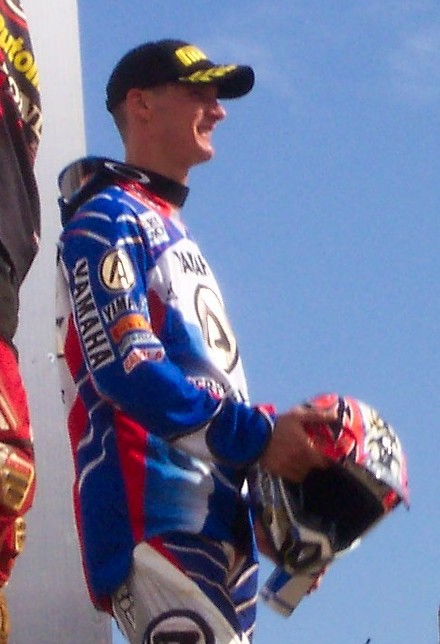
Everts on the MX1 podium at the 2004 British GP (Arreton, IOW)

- 1990: Belgian Champion, 125cc (Suzuki)
- 1991: World Champion, 125cc - winner 5 GPs; Belgian Champion, 125cc; Youngest world champion at that time (Suzuki)
- 1993: Belgian Champion, 250cc (Suzuki)
- 1995: World Champion, 250cc - winner 5 GPs; Winner "Motocross of Nations" (Kawasaki)
- 1996: World Champion, 250cc - winner 5 GPs (Honda)
- 1997: World Champion, 250cc - winner 9 GPs; Winner "Motocross of Nations" (Honda)
- 1998: Belgian Champion, 250cc; Winner "Motocross of Nations" (Honda)
- 2001: World Champion, 500cc - winner 7 GPs; First rider winning world championships on all four Japanese bikes (Yamaha)
- 2002: World Champion, 500cc - winner 4 GPs (Yamaha)
- 2003: World Champion, Motocross GP - winner 8 GPs; Winner "Motocross of Nations" (Yamaha)
- 2003: International Six Days Enduro Brasil overall winner (scratch)(Yamaha)
- 2004: World Champion, Motocross GP - winner 7 GPs; Winner "Motocross of Nations" (Yamaha)
- 2005: World Champion, MX1-GP - winner 8 GPs; Belgian Champion (Yamaha)
- 2006: World Champion, MX1-GP winner 14 GPs (Yamaha)

RECENT SEASONS:

Year	Rnd 1	Rnd 2	Rnd 3	Rnd 4	Rnd 5	Rnd 6	Rnd 7	Rnd 8	Rnd 9	Rnd 10	Rnd 11	Rnd 12	Rnd 13	Rnd 14	Rnd 15	Rnd 16	Rnd 17	Average Finish	Podium Percent	Place
2003 MX1	3	9	4	1	1	1	1	1	1	1	1	1	-	-	-	-	-	2.08	83%	1st
2004 MX1	1	2	1	2	1	3	1	1	2	3	2	1	2	1	8	-	-	2.07	93%	1st
2005 MX1	1	5	1	1	4	1	1	2	4	3	2	3	2	1	5	1	1	2.23	76%	1st
2006 MX1	1	1	1	1	1	1	1	1	1	1	1	1	2	1	1	-	-	1.07	100%	1st

Sporting positions
Preceded by Donny Schmit	World Champion - 125cc (1); 1991	Succeeded by Greg Albertyn
Preceded by Greg Albertyn	World Champion - 250cc (3); 1995–1997	Succeeded by Sebastien Tortelli
Preceded by Joël Smets	World Champion - 500cc (2); 2001–2002	Succeeded by Cancelled
New creation	World Champion - MX1 (4); 2003–2006	Succeeded by Steve Ramon
