= Shayne King =

New Zealand motorcycle racer

- Nationality: New Zealander
- Born: 1970 (age 55–56) New Plymouth, New Zealand

Motocross career
- Years active: 1993–2001
- Teams: KTM
- Championships: 500cc – 1996
- Wins: 5

Shayne King (born 1975) is a former professional Grand Prix motocross racer from New Zealand. He competed in the Motocross World Championships from 1993 to 2001. King is notable for being the first New Zealand competitor to win an FIM motocross world championship. He was inducted into the New Zealand Motorcycle Hall of Fame in 2008.

Born in New Plymouth, New Zealand, King began competing in the FIM world championships in 1993 and clinched the 500cc title in 1996 riding for the KTM team. He was New Zealand's first-ever motocross world champion. In 1997, he finished in third place behind Joël Smets and his older brother Darryl King. He now competes in New Zealand and Australia, winning the New Zealand national championship in 2003.
