= Joël Smets =

Belgian motorcycle racer

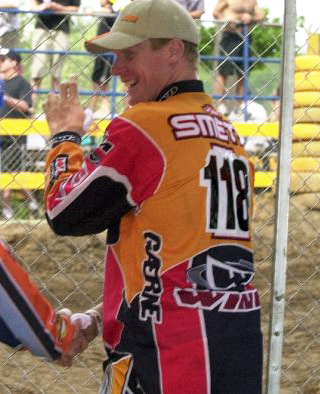
- Nationality: Belgian
- Born: 6 April 1969 (age 57) Mol, Antwerp, Belgium

Motocross career
- Years active: 1989 – 2005
- Teams: Vertemati, Husaberg, KTM, Suzuki
- Championships: 500cc- 1995, 1997, 1998, 2000; MX3-GP- 2003
- Wins: 57

Joël Smets (born 6 April 1969) is a Belgian former professional motocross racer and current Racing Sports Director for KTM motorcycles. He competed in the Motocross World Championships from 1989 to 2005. Smets is notable for being a five-time motocross world champion, six-time Belgian national champion and was Belgian Sportsman of the year in 2000. His 57 career Grand Prix victories ranks him fourth overall among motocross world championship competitors.

== International career ==
Smets was born in Mol, Antwerp. Nicknamed The Flemish Lion during his career, Smets was named after his parents' favorite rider Joël Robert. He didn't start racing until he was seventeen years old and found his feet on the Grand Prix scene rather quickly. In 1993 Smets won the German Grand Prix, and finished the season in third place in the 500cc championship.

A year later Smets, riding the Vertemati machine, won two Grands Prix and again finished third in the world. By 1995 and racing for the Husaberg factory he was set to clinch his first ever world title, winning the 500cc championship from American Trampas Parker. The battle between Parker and Smets was a tense one with Smets wrapping up the title in the last round of the series in Germany.

A knee injury during the 1996 season hampered the defense of Smets' world championship and, New Zealand's Shayne King claimed the championship crown. Smets came back from his injury to win two consecutive 500cc world championships in 1997 and 1998. He also represented Belgium at the 1998 International Six Days Enduro, a form of off-road motorcycle Olympics, and won a gold medal by winning the 400cc four stroke class. Smets' title defense in the 1999 season was marred by eight mechanical failures as he finished third in the championship.

Smets joined the KTM factory racing team for the 2000 500cc world championship and dominated the competition by winning 12 out go 16 Grand Prix races, including eight Grands Prix in a row. He finished second to Stefan Everts in the 2001 and 2002 seasons.

In 2003, Smets competed in the newly formed MX1-GP championship for machines with 450cc four stroke engines. He rode a KTM to a second-place finish behind Everts in an exciting season of racing. Smets also contested the MX3 class for motorcycles with a 650cc engine capacity in 2003, winning that title, picking up his 57th Grand Prix victory and his fifth open class world championship leaving him ties with Roger De Coster.

Smets joined Sylvain Geboers' Alstare Suzuki Team for the 2004 season but, suffered a major injury at the season opening round in the Mantova International. The injury saw him miss his assault on any title in 2004. The 2005 season was another season he would not reach his true potential as he battled to match Everts on the track. He did win races, but could never get that Grand Prix overall. He announced his retirement from international competition at the age of 37 after injuring his knee at the Gaildorf circuit in Germany.

Smets retired with 57 Grand Prix victories. At the time of his retirement, his 57 career Grand Prix victories ranked second only to Stefan Everts 87 victories at the time. As of 2019, he ranks fourth all-time behind Everts (101), Antonio Cairoli (86), and Jeffrey Herlings (84). Smets was also a member of victorious Belgium teams at the Motocross des Nations in 1995, 1997 and 2003.

At the beginning of the 2006 season, Smets teamed up with MTM Suzuki to race in international races and the Belgium national championship races. After the 2006 season, Smets retired from international and national racing altogether. At the start of the 2007 season, Smets was managing a small team. By mid season Smets had moved to BMW to work on development of their new 450cc enduro machine, which saw Smets competing in some rounds of the World Enduro Championship.

After retiring, Smets managed the Belgian Motocross des Nations team for 11 years. In 2015, Smets was named Racing Sports Director for KTM motorcycles.
