= Darryl King =

New Zealand motocross racer

Darryll King
- Nationality: New Zealander
- Born: 21 January 1969 (age 57) New Plymouth, New Zealand

Motocross career
- Years active: 1993 - 1998
- Teams: Kawasaki, Husqvarna
- Wins: 3

Darryll King (born 21 January 1969) is a former professional Grand Prix motocross racer from New Zealand.

Born in New Plymouth, New Zealand, King began competing in the F.I.M. Motocross World Championships in the 1990s. He finished in the top-five six times including second-place finishes in 1997 and 1998. King is also a 19-time New Zealand motocross national champion and a three-time Australian motocross champion. He is the older brother of 1996 500cc motocross world champion, Shayne King.
