= Husaberg =

Motorcycle company

Husaberg AB
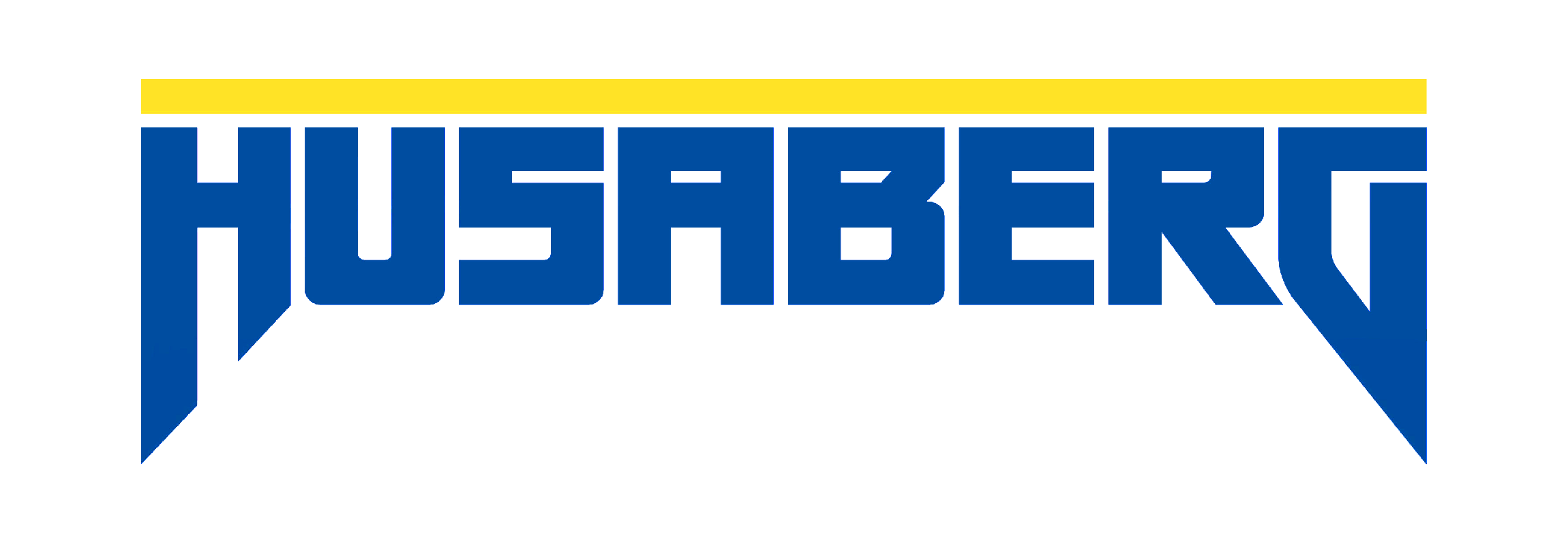
- Husaberg Logo
- Type: Subsidiary
- Industry: Motorcycle
- Founded: 1988
- Defunct: 2014
- Successor: Husqvarna Motorcycles
- Headquarters: Mattighofen, Austria
- Parent: KTM

Husaberg was a manufacturer of enduro motorcycles with four and two-stroke engines, the displacements ranging from 125 cc to 650 cc. Originally based in Sweden, its motorcycles were later manufactured in Austria by parent company KTM until the line was retired in 2014.

== History ==
=== Foundation ===
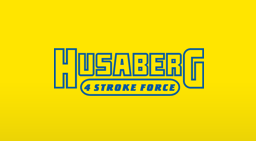
Husaberg logo in 2007

Husaberg Motor AB was established in 1988 from the circumstances of the purchase of the motorcycle division of Swedish company Husqvarna by the Italian manufacturer Cagiva in 1987. Cagiva shifted the production of motorcycles to Varese, Italy. A group of engineers led by Thomas Gustavsson decided to stay in Sweden and continue to work on their project. Husaberg Motor AB was registered in January 1988. The other Husqvarna employees who joined Husaberg were Ruben Helmin (Husqvarna chief engineer and Husaberg's first managing director), Urban Larsson (Husqvarna designer ), Björn Elwin (chief of Husqvarna test department). Roland Söderqwist, a small Swedish mechanical firm owner was also involved in the foundation of the company. The first factory was set up in a woodshed by lake Vättern in the town of Husabergs Udde, from which the name of the company is derived.

The name Husaberg was only made official by Gustavsson when entering an enduro race at Skillingaryd, as he was forced to declare the make of his motorcycle.

The Husaberg team tried to compensate for their lack of funds by their technical innovations and could never afford to hire established professional riders but rather ambitious rookies such as Joël Smets, Jimmie Eriksson, Walter Bartolini, Kent Karlsson, Anders Eriksson, Jaroslav Katriňák, Mike Tosswill and Peter Jansson.

=== Takeover by KTM ===
Good results on track could not compensate for slow sales, and Husaberg was eventually purchased by the Austrian motorcycle manufacturer KTM in 1995.

In 2003, production was moved to the KTM factory in Mattighofen, Austria, along with the development department. However, the Motorsport department remained in Sweden.

Husaberg's previous slogan, "Ready to Race" was adopted by KTM as its own. Husaberg then adopted the slogan "4 Stroke force" as up until 2012 they only produced four stroke bikes, and were a leader in 4-stroke performance. The final slogan used was "Pure Enduro".

=== End of the Husaberg brand ===
In 2014, Husaberg celebrated not only its 25th anniversary but the last year of the brand. In January 2013, Stefan Pierer, The CEO of KTM-Sportmotorcycle AG a 51% shareholder of KTM AG, purchased 100% stake in Husqvarna AG from BMW through his company Pierer Industrie AG and renamed it to Husqvarna Sportmotorcycle GmbH. Although Husaberg AB and Husqvarna Sportmotocycle GmbH were not merged, it was decided by both KTM and Pierer Industrie that Husaberg brand would cease to exist, citing to reunite what came out of shared roots 25 years ago. Husqvarna then used Husaberg's technology while keeping the better-known brand name of Husqvarna.

== Reliability ==
The earlier Husaberg engines (1989–1996) were known to have premature engine failures due to the fact that they do not have an oil pump and rely on oil delivery from the timing chain. The reliability and quality of the engines have improved over the years and, from 1997 on, have been comparable to that of more established brands.

== Palmares ==
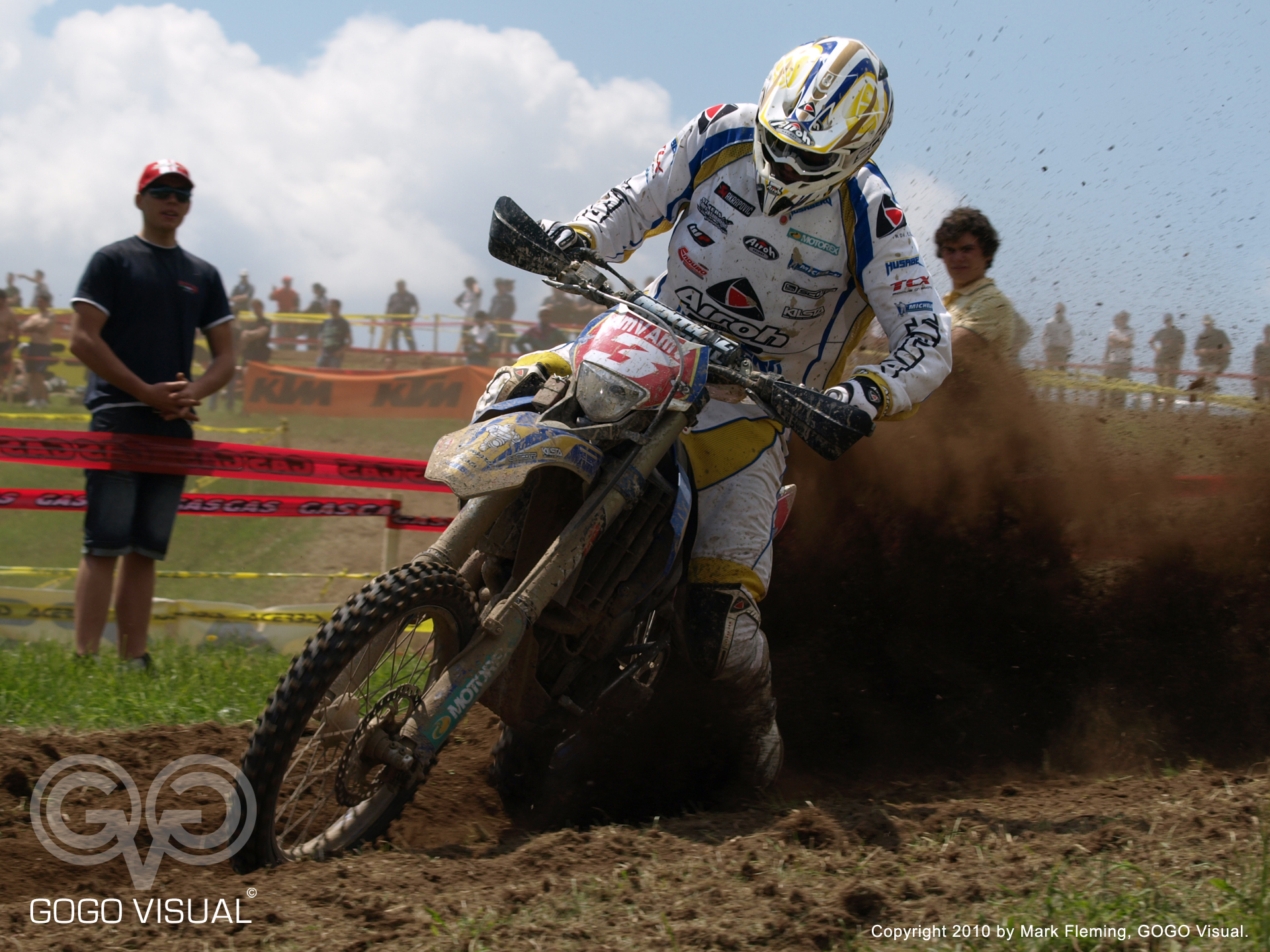
Joakim Ljunggren at the 2010 WEC Grand Prix of Italy

Husaberg won the FIM 500 cc Motocross World Championship with Belgian rider Joël Smets in 1995, 1997 and 1998.

They have also won 6 Enduro World Championships in 1990, 1991 (2), 1995, 1996 and 1998. Three more Junior Enduro World Championships followed in 2005/2006 by Joakim Ljunggren and in 2009 by Oriol Mena.

== Military use ==
The Swedish military used Husaberg motorcycles, notably for the demonstration team, the Arméns Lejon.

== Models ==
The last lineup included enduro models only. The supermoto, motocross and cross-country (wide ratio gearing, no lighting kit) models were discontinued. The model names are all composed of two letters: "F" as "Four-Stroke" and "T" as "Two-Stroke" both followed by an "E" as in "Enduro" "X for motocross, "C" for cross country and "S" for Supermoto. Some older models were also listed with the number of gears: 4 or 6. Another identifying letter was an "e" suffix indicating the motorcycle had and electric start system e.g., FE 650e.

Various models included different displacements, such as:

- 650 cc Enduros, Motocross and Supermoto
- 550 cc Enduros, motocross and Supermoto
- 501 cc enduro and motocross
- 470 cc cross-country
- 450 cc enduros, and motocross
- 400 cc enduro
- 390 cc enduros and motocross
- 350 cc enduro

=== 2014 models ===
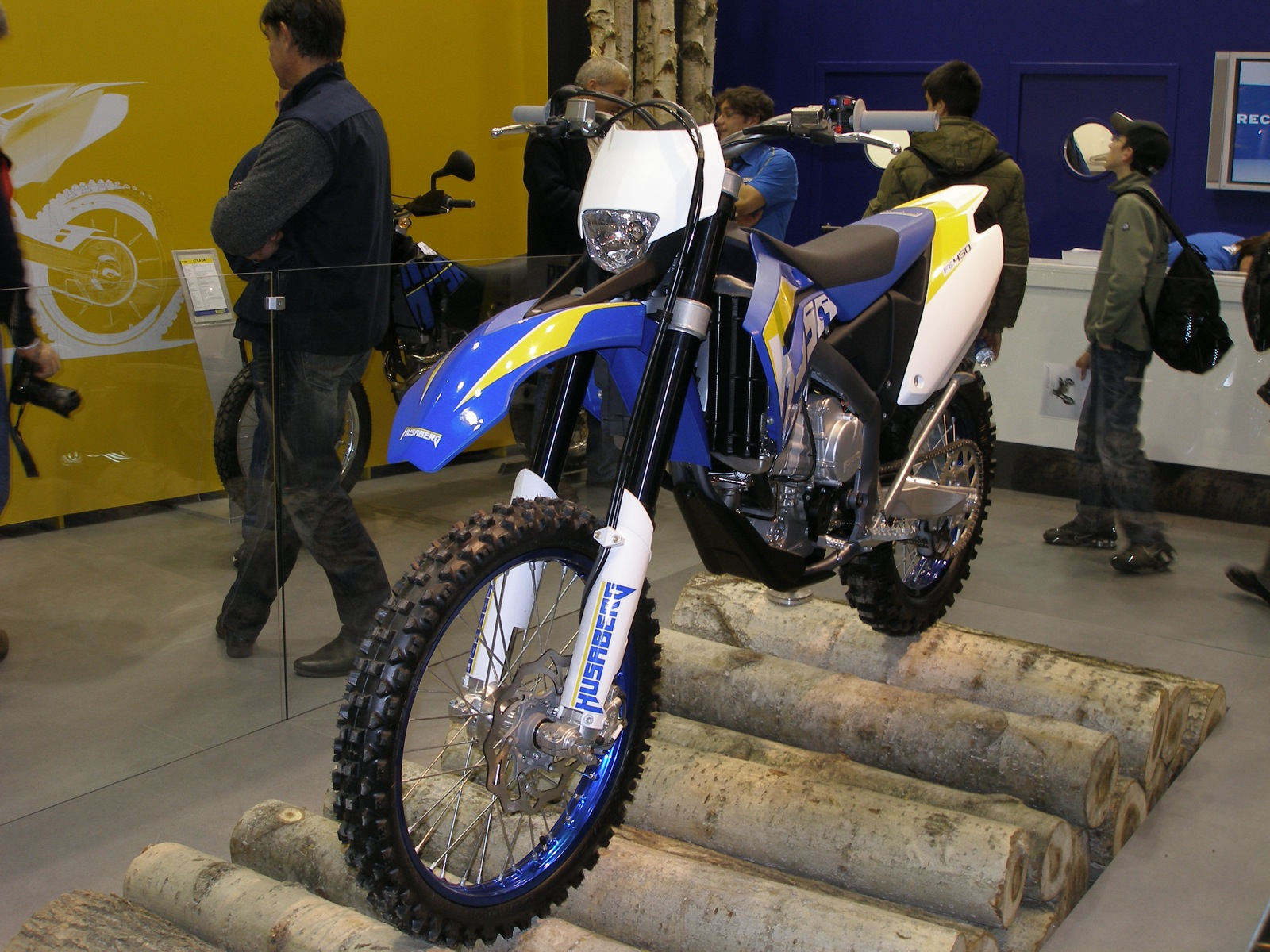
Husaberg FE 450

Enduro models were offered in both two-stroke and four-stroke. All models had special 25th anniversary graphics and all new suspension settings. The 4CS USD WP Closed Cartridge forks were extensively revised. The 250 four-strokes received an all new engine, new exhaust system and an all new ECU. The 250/350 4-stroke frames were improved and made lighter and more nimble. The lower triple clamp was redesigned to ensure a smoother fork action. Finally, all models received a new improved Trail Tech speedometer.

4-stroke Enduro:

- FE 250 - 250 cc enduro
- FE 350 - 350 cc enduro
- FE 450 - 450 cc enduro
- FE 501 - 510 cc enduro

Two-stroke Enduro:

- TE 125 - 125 cc two-stroke enduro
- TE 250 - 250 cc two-stroke enduro
- TE 300 - 300 cc two-stroke enduro

=== 2011 models ===
Besides technical refinements for the existing models, Husaberg started offering two-stroke models for the first time in its history.

4-stroke Enduro:

- FE 390 - 390 cc enduro
- FE 450 - 450 cc enduro
- FE 570 - 565 cc enduro

4-stroke Motocross:

- FX 450 - 450 cc cross country

Supermoto:

- FS 570 - 565 cc super moto

Two-stroke Enduro:

- TE 250 - 250 cc two-stroke enduro
- TE 300 - 300 cc two-stroke enduro

=== 2010 models ===
The model lineup for 2010 added three new models to the program. All models were based on the chassis and engine that was introduced in 2009. The models are:

Enduro:

- FE 390 (new) - 390 cc enduro
- FE 450 - 450 cc enduro
- FE 570 - 565 cc enduro

Motocross/cross country:

- FX 450 (new) - 450 cc Motocross

Supermoto:

- FS 570 (new) - 565 cc super moto

=== 2009 models ===
For 2009 there were two enduro models available with the new revolutionary engine and a lot of other technical highlights:

Enduro:

- FE 450 - 450 cc enduro with electric start only
- FE 570 - 565 cc enduro with electric start only

=== 2009 Redesign ===
On November 6, 2007, at the International Motorcycle Exhibition in Milano, Husaberg unveiled a totally new design for the FE 450 E, announced as the 2009 model. Apart from sporting new fairing, the new design included a totally revamped engine, in a new position, rotated 180 degrees from top to bottom, and inclined forward at 70 degrees from vertical. The carburetor was replaced by an EFI injection system and the chain drive was placed on the more standard left side.

The 70° (09-2012) bikes are considered by Officiandos as the last true Husabergs as, as of 2013 the Husabergs shared the same parts and their KTM sisters. The revolutionary design is praised by fans, as they believe that the low center of gravity and crank angle aid in finding traction on the power stroke.

=== 2008 Models ===
The models for 2008 were as follow:

Enduro:

- FE 450 E - 450 cc enduro with electric start
- FE 550 E - 550 cc enduro with electric start
- FE 650 E - 628 cc enduro with electric start

Supermoto:

- FS 550 E - 550 cc supermoto with electric start
- FS 650 E - 628 cc supermoto with electric start
- FS 650 C - 628 cc supermoto without electric start race only version
