= Donny Schmit =

American motorcycle racer

- Nationality: American
- Born: January 17, 1967 Minneapolis, Minnesota
- Died: January 19, 1996 (aged 29) Coon Rapids, Minnesota

Motocross career
- Years active: 1986–1995
- Teams: Kawasaki, Suzuki, Honda
- Championships: AMA 125cc Western SX - 1986 FIM 125cc - 1990 FIM 250cc - 1992
- Wins: 15

Donny Schmit (January 17, 1967 – January 19, 1996) was an American professional motocross racer. He competed in the AMA Motocross Championships from 1986 to 1989 and, in the Motocross World Championships from 1990 to 1994. Schmit was notable for being a two-time motocross world champion, winning the 125cc title in 1990 and the 250cc championship in 1992.

== Motorcycle racing career ==
Born in Minneapolis, Minnesota, Schmit started racing when his father bought him a Honda XR75. He signed with Kawasaki’s Team Green as an amateur. In 1986, Schmit turned pro, winning two AMA 125cc West Region Supercross races in his first season on the pro tour.

In 1987, Schmit signed with Suzuki, winning the AMA Motocross National in the 125cc division at Anderson, South Carolina. Schmit also won the 125 national at his home circuit in Millville and finished the year ranked fifth.

By 1988, Schmit was racing in the 250cc AMA Supercross division, but was injured and decided to stay with outdoor motocross. That season, Schmit had seven podium finishes in AMA 125 motocross, including a Millville victory, and finished runner-up to George Holland. He was AMA's Rookie of the Year. Schmit left Suzuki after 1988 and rode the AMA outdoor nationals as a privateer. He finished 1989 ranking fourth in the AMA 125 Motocross; he was the top-ranked non-factory rider. At the season's end, Team Bieffe Suzuki offered Schmit a sponsorship to ride in the Grand Prix world championships. Schmit was an immediate success, winning the 1990 125cc world championship.

In 1991, Schmit was injured at the Hungarian Grand Prix, causing him to miss much of the remaining season. In 1992, Schmit rode for Chesterfield Yamaha, and won his second world title, along with five 250 GP wins. He rode for Chesterfield Yamaha for two seasons, finishing third in 1993 and seventh in 1994. At the end of the 1994 season, Schmit retired from full-time racing.

In 1995, Schmit returned to the AMA Nationals at Millville, finishing fourth place for Honda of Troy. He also won the four-stroke Motocross Championship for CCM in San Bernardino, California.

Schmit died on January 19, 1996, from aplastic anemia, after his wife Carrie rushed him to the hospital with a severe headache. He had been awaiting a bone marrow transplant.

Schmit's 15 career victories in World Motocross Grand Prix were a record for an American rider. In 2002, Schmit was inducted into the AMA Motorcycle Hall of Fame. A jump at his hometown track in Millville, Minnesota, "Holy Schmit" is named in his memory.
