= Mark Barnett (motorcyclist) =

American motorcycle racer

- Nationality: American
- Born: September 16, 1960 (age 66) Bridgeview, Illinois

Motocross career
- Years active: 1977 - 1989
- Teams: Suzuki, Kawasaki
- Championships: AMA 125cc - 1980, 1981, 1982 AMA 250cc Supercross - 1981
- Wins: 43

Mark Barnett (born September 16, 1960) is an American former professional motocross racer. He competed in the AMA Motocross Championships from 1977 to 1989, most prominently as a member of the Suzuki factory racing team where he won three consecutive AMA 125cc national championships between 1980 and 1982. In 2000, Barnett was inducted into the AMA Motorcycle Hall of Fame.

== Motocross racing career ==
Born in Bridgeview, Illinois, Barnett began racing as an amateur in Illinois and Indiana. In 1976, he was crowned the AMA 125cc Amateur National Champion and, began his professional racing career in 1977 as a member of the Fox Factory racing team. He scored three top-ten finishes and placed sixth in the final standings of the 125cc national championship.

In 1978, Barnett became one of the few riders from the Midwest to earn factory sponsorship when he signed a factory contract with Suzuki. Along with his three national championships, he also won the 1981 AMA Supercross championship. Barnett was a member of the victorious American 1983 Motocross des Nations team that included David Bailey, Broc Glover and Jeff Ward.

After retiring from competition, Barnett began to design supercross and motocross tracks for pro riders like Ricky Carmichael and Ivan Tedesco. In 2000, Barnett was inducted into the AMA Motorcycle Hall of Fame.
