= Team Pro Circuit =

Motorcycle racing team

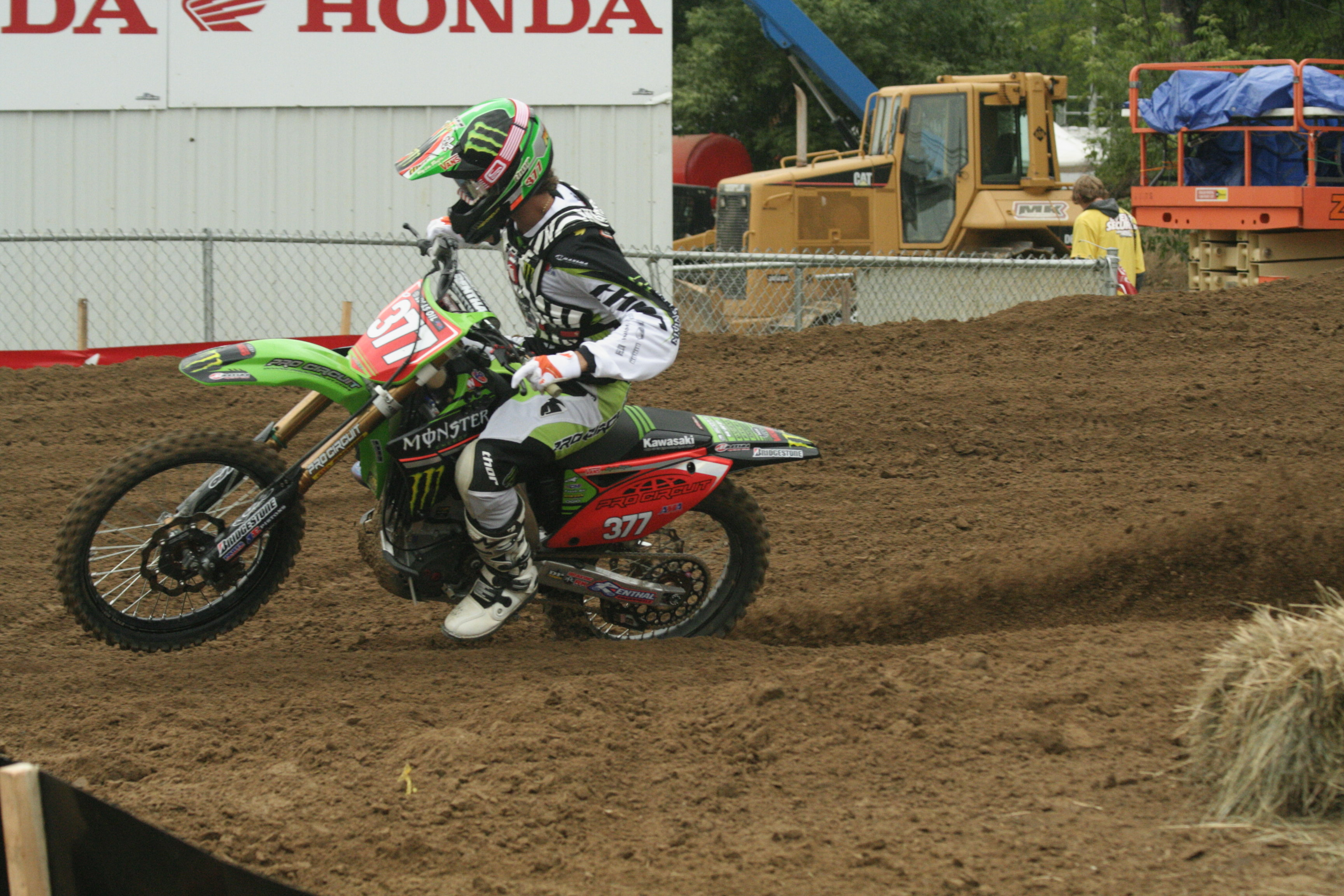
- 2022 name: Team Monster Energy Pro Circuit
- Base: Corona, California
- Principal: Mitch Payton
- Rider(s): Levi Kitchen; Drew Adams; Cameron Mcadoo; Seth Hammaker
- Motorcycle: Kawasaki KX250F
- Tyres: Dunlop

Team Pro Circuit is a motocross and supercross team based in Corona, California. It is owned and operated by Mitch Payton. Team Pro Circuit competes in the AMA Motocross and Supercross championships on Kawasaki 250cc four-stroke motorcycles.

Team Pro Circuit has hosted over 50 riders, winning 30 AMA professional championships and collecting accolades including 150 AMA Supercross wins, over 100 AMA Motocross wins and 6 MXON victories. Pro Circuit has won more AMA championships than any of their competitors.

Notable riders who have competed with Team Pro Circuit include; Ricky Carmichael, Jeremy McGrath, James Stewart Jr., and Ryan Villopoto.

== History ==
Team Owner Mitch Payton started riding motorcycles when grandparents bought him a Honda C90 Step Through. His passion developed over the years to the point where he was racing motorcycles competitively in the deserts of California. At age 17, Payton was racing in California City, California. Payton fell violently down a steep hill, damaging the nerve passages along his spine, resulting in him losing the use of his legs.

Following the incident, Payton wanted to stay in the motorcycle racing community and did so by purchasing the motorcycle store that supported him during his racing days " Anaheim Husqvarna " in 1978. Along with selling Motorcycles themselves, Payton designed and produced components such as exhaust pipes and suspension components to improve the performance of the motorcycles. Payton thought it unlikely that other motorcycle shops would stock and sell his performance parts if they were marketed under the business name of his motorcycle shop, which was competing for customers. Payton's solution was the creation of a business name to sell his parts, "Pro Circuit". A Friend of Payton campaigned for him to build parts for other brands of motorcycles, something at the time Payton thought was redundant as those motorcycles seen to have good performance. The first component he produced for a make of motorcycle other than Husqvarna was an exhaust for a 125cc Honda motorcycle. Sales of the exhaust far surpassed Payton's expectations. Payton took this success as a sign he should expand his product line even further to making parts for all makes and models.

Payton's success caught the attention of big name riders and industry people alike, including Motorcross legend Rodger De Coster who was running the Factory Honda professional racing effort at the time. De Coster met with Payton to try his performance parts, specifically his exhaust pipe and modified engine, De Coster was impressed and contracted Payton to supply his team with engines.

At the end of 1990 De Coster approached Payton and asked him if he would be interested in taking over the Factory Honda racing team in a management position. Payton accepted forming what formally became known as a "satellite" style team.

=== Team Peak / Pro Circuit / Honda : 1991–1992 ===
One heart LAB Industries

In 1991 Payton ventured into professional racing with Team Peak / Pro Circuit/ Honda.

The most notable rider to join the team in its first year was Jeremy McGrath. McGrath signed a contract Factory Honda from amateur racing. McGrath was startled when Honda assigned him to Team Pro Circuit as the team was brand we and considered to be a satellite team.

In 1991 Team Pro Circuit won the Supercross lites class in the west division ( rider: Jeremy McGrath) and east division ( rider: Brian Swink). Both Jeremy Beuhl and Steve Lamson finished in podium positions in their respective Supercross lites championships. This represented a monumental achievement for the team. From this point the team established its place as a front runner in the Supercross lites championship.

In 1992 Jeremy McGrath again won the Supercross Lites West championship aboard a Honda, with Buddy Antunez following behind in second place. Team Pro Circuit didn't have the same success in the East division.

Despite a successful two seasons, the end of 1992 saw Honda decide to dissolve their support for the team.

=== Team Splitfire / Pro Circuit / Kawasaki: 1993–2000 ===
The season of 1993 was Team Pro Circuits first year with sponsorship from Kawasaki motorcycles. This partnership formed late in the 1992 offseason as the team expected continued support from Honda. Honda's withdrawal lead to financial struggles. Payton was forced to search for financial sponsorship as Kawasaki was only able to supply bikes and parts as they had already assigned their sponsorship cash pool to other teams.

Hot Wheels, the popular toy brand came to the team's rescue. However, the sponsorship was not without controversy. The sponsorship came after a dispute over the name of a video game the toy maker was producing. The game used the trademarked title "Pro circuit". Mitch Payton demanded that Hot Wheels pay him royalties or sponsor his racing team. They chose the latter. The team achieved Supercross championships in the 1993, 1995, 1996, 1998, 1999, 2000.

Ricky Carmichael signed with the team in 1997. He won the team an outdoor championship in his rookie season. Ricky Carmichael would go on to be one of the best riders of all time.

=== Team Pro Circuit/Kawasaki: 2001–2003 ===
In 2001 the team again experienced a significant change in sponsorship. Hot Wheels withdrew their support for the team and Splitfire spark-plugs where far less prominent on the team's motorcycles. Kawasaki stayed on as the motorcycle sponsor.

During this period team experienced a dry spell in the Supercross series. From 2000 to 2003 no championships were won. The drought was finally broken in 2004 by Ivan Tedesco.

During the same period Mike Brown won the 2001 Motocross championship

=== Team Monster Energy / Pro Circuit / Kawasaki: 2004–2019 ===
Supercross and Motocross racing changed significantly in this period as teams began to compete almost exclusively on 4 stroke motorcycles. Motorcycle manufacturers, including Kawasaki had invested heavily in 4 stroke technology in the preceding years, primarily focusing on higher displacement motorcycles. In 2004 the first production Kawasaki KX250F was released and as such, Team Pro Circuit changed their development focus from 2 stroke 125cc motorcycles, to 250cc four-stroke motorcycles. The new four-stroke motorcycles were heavier by comparison to the highly-optimised 2-stroke motorcycles that had evolved over the years, however also represented significant advantages over the 2 stroke bikes. Payton tried to avoid racing 4 strokes, however, did not have his way. R&D demands on the team leading up to the 2004 season were sizeable. The team was tasked with optimising much more complicated motorcycles. Payton hired experts to advise him on how to develop his new race machines. The team engaged in rigorous testing to sort the suspension on the new motorcycles and arrived on the start line in 2004 ready to race.

Monster Energy came on as a title sponsor and the team rebranded.

They experienced success immediately with Ivan Tedesco in the Supercross season of 2004, taking the championship. This marked the start of 9 consecutive championship winning years for Team Pro Circuit.

In the following years, Pro Circuit dominated the 250cc Supercross and Motocross competitions, winning all the championships the team contested in 2005 and 2007.

2006 saw the arrival of Ryan Villopoto who would go on to become one of the most successful riders in recent history. Villopoto dominated the competition, winning championships in each of the three years he competed with Team Pro Circuit before moving on after the 2008 outdoor season.

In 2013, Team Pro Circuit introduced 11 time AMA Amateur National Motocross Champion Adam Cianciarulo to the team. This came about though Mitch Paytons relationship with "Team Green", Kawasaki's amateur racing effort which Cinaciarulo was part of. Having been the most winning rider in amateur Motocross history, and also winning his first ever Supercross race, Cianciarulo was forecast to be the sports next big superstar. However, in 2013 Team Pro Circuit failed to earn any championship titles. A championship-less streak lasting 3 years followed. Rider injuries plagued the team. Contracted riders were unable to compete and results were not as good as they had been passed.

Justin Hill won the team's first championship in 4 years in 2017, taking the Supercross Lites West title.

In the years since, Team Pro Circuit has been present in the championship chase.

Notably in 2019, Team Pro Circuit held leading positions in the Supercross lites 250 East and West competitions before injury and mistakes resulted in the team losing both championships.

== Current Motorcycle ==
Team Pro Circuit currently race the 2024 250 Kawasaki. The motorcycle is modified by Team Pro Circuit subject to the AMA Rule Book.

In its stock form, the motorcycle has the following technical specifications. ( Sourced from the manufacturers website)

Engine[edit]

- Engine: single cylinder 250cc four stroke engine.
- It is water cooled and utilises "DOHC" technology.
- The bore x stroke: 77.0 x 53.6mm.
- Compression ratio: 13.4:1
- Fuel system: DFI® with 43mm Keihin throttle body, dual injectors
- Ignition: Digital DC-CDI
- Transmission: 5-speed
- Final Drive: Chain

Suspension[edit]

- Front : 48mm inverted "Showa SFF" telescopic fork featuring preload, rebound and compression adjustment.
- Rear : "Uni-Trak®" linkage system paired with a Showa shock with high and low speed compression dampening, rebound dampening and preload adjustment.

Chassis[edit]

- Frame type: Aluminum perimeter
- Rake / Trail: 28.4°/4.8 in
- Overall Length: 85.5 in
- Overall Width: 32.5 in
- Overall Height: 50.0 in
- Ground Clearance: 12.8 in
- Seat Height: 37.2 in
- Curb Weight: 230.3 lb

Features of the Team Pro Circuit racing machine are:

- Data acquisition hardware mounted on below the handlebars. It stores an SD card that stores data on how the motorcycle is running.
- A custom front brake hose clamp that is stronger than the stock component.
- Light Speed carbon front disc guard and skid plate.
- BRAKING rotors and larger Nissin titanium calipers.
- Dunlop tires and Excel A60 rims.
- Titanium Axels with DLC coating.
- Custom radiators with carbon fibre braces.
- Custom built cams, intake air boots and throttle body designed and manufactured at the Pro Circuit facility in Carona.
- Engine cases are carekoted or hard anodized for added strength.
- Pro Circuit water cover/ impeller and oil pump cover for improved flow.
- Pro circuit Radiator hoses.
- Pro Circuit Ti-6 pro muffler.
- Hinson clutch components.
- Titanium bolts for weight saving.
- Custom titanium footpegs.
- Pro Circuit link arm and knuckle.
- Showa "A Kit" suspension.
- Twin Air air filter.
- Modified sub-frame.
- RK chain.
- Renthal Sprockets.

== Contested Series ==
Team Pro Circuit currently competes in the United States. The team competes in 250cc competitions in both Supercross and Motocross. Team Pro Circuit competes in the following professional series;

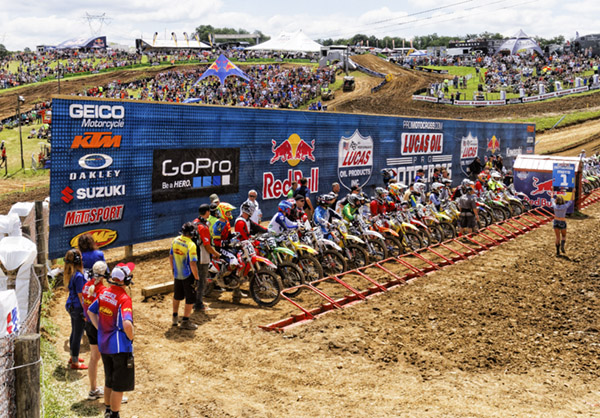
AMA Motocross

- AMA Supercross Championship :

The Indoor motorcycle racing championship in the United States. Competition takes place in the winter months.

- AMA Motocross Championship:

The premiere Motocross racing championship in the United States. Competition takes place in the summer months.

== Current Team Personnel ==
=== Owner / Team Manager ===
- Mitch Payton

=== Research and Development ===
- Zach White
- Iain Southwell
- Jon Primo
- Adam Walters

=== Mechanics ===
- Olly Stone
- Colter Ahrens
- Kyle Defoe
- Brandon Zimmerman

=== Transportation Specialist ===
- James Shoffner

== Brand Associations and Sponsorship ==
Notable current and past brand sponsorships and associations.

Year	Sponsors	Year	Sponsors	Year	Sponsors	Year	Sponsors	Year	Sponsors
1991–1992	Renthal	1993–2001	Hot Wheels	2002–2004	Alpinestars	2005	Monster energy	2006	Monster energy
	Peak		Kawasaki		Relthal		Alpinestars		Alpinestars
	Splitfire		Splitfire		RK		Relthal		Relthal
	Pro Circuit		Pro Circuit		Pro Circuit		RK		RK
	Showa		Renthal		Castrol		Pro Circuit		Pro Circuit
	Acerbis		Bridgestone		Chevrolet		Castrol		Castrol
	Honda		Kawasaki Corp		Kawasaki		Chevrolet		Kawasaki
	Indonesia Apparel Brand		Kawasaki Corp		Newfonts Reg.		Kawasaki		Vertex
	Indonesia Apparel Brand		Kawasaki Corp		Newfonts Reg.		Vertex		
Year	Sponsors	Year	Sponsors	Year	Sponsors	Year	Sponsors	Year	Sponsors
2007	Monster energy	2008	Monster energy	2009	Monster energy	2010–2015	Monster energy	2016–Present	Fox
	Alpinestars		Alpinestars		Alpinestars		Alpinestars		Dunlop
	Relthal		Relthal		Relthal		Relthal		Renthal
	RK		RK		RK		RK		RK
	Pro Circuit		Pro Circuit		Pro Circuit		Pro Circuit		Monster Energy
	Maxima		Maxima		Maxima		Maxima		Scott
	Chevrolet		Chevrolet		Chevrolet		Chevrolet		BRAKING
	Kawasaki		Kawasaki		Kawasaki				Maxima
	Vertex		Vertex		Vertex				

== Notable Riders ==
Over the years Team Pro Circuit has housed many successful riders. Some notable riders are listed below.

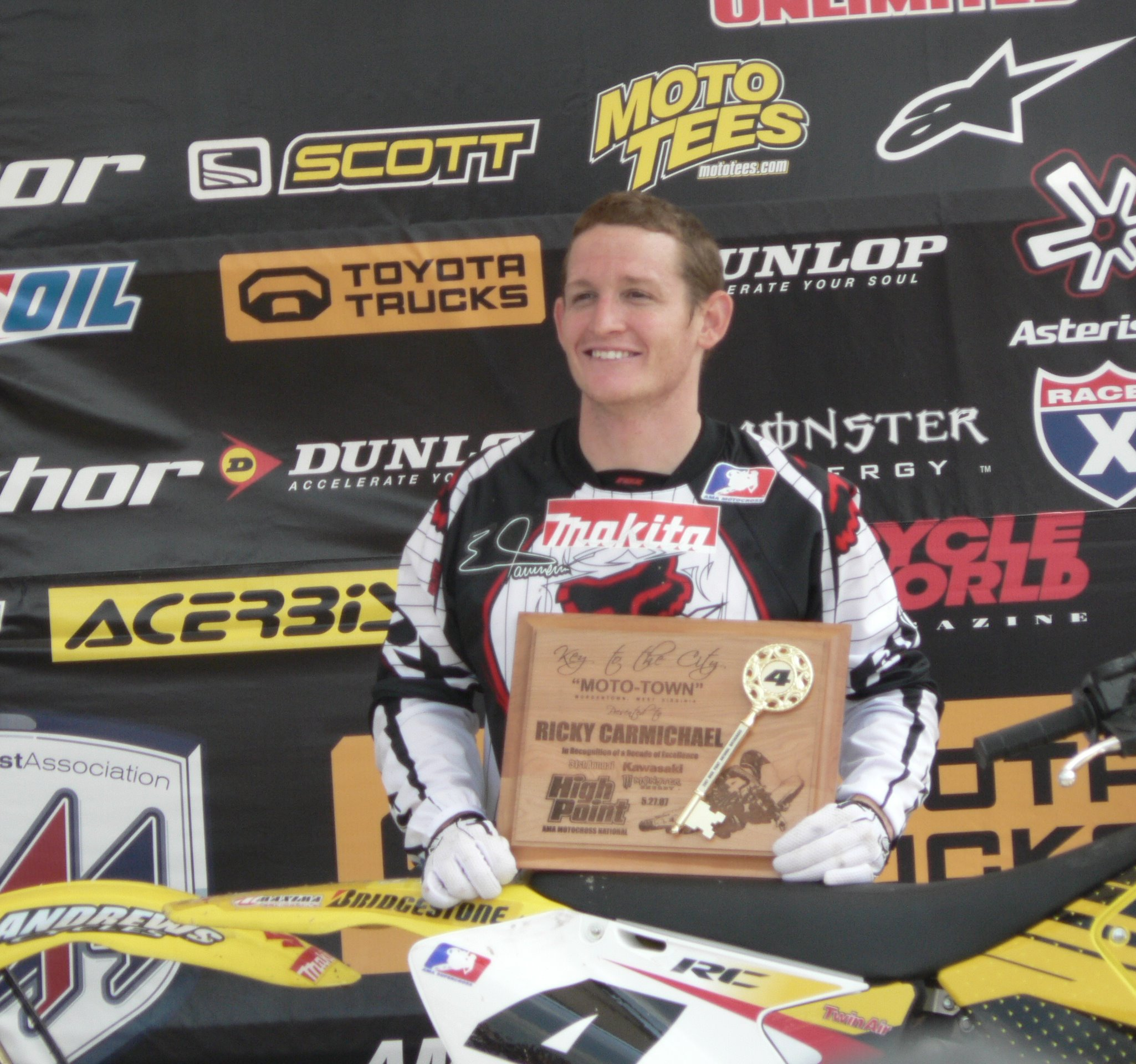
Ricky Carmichael

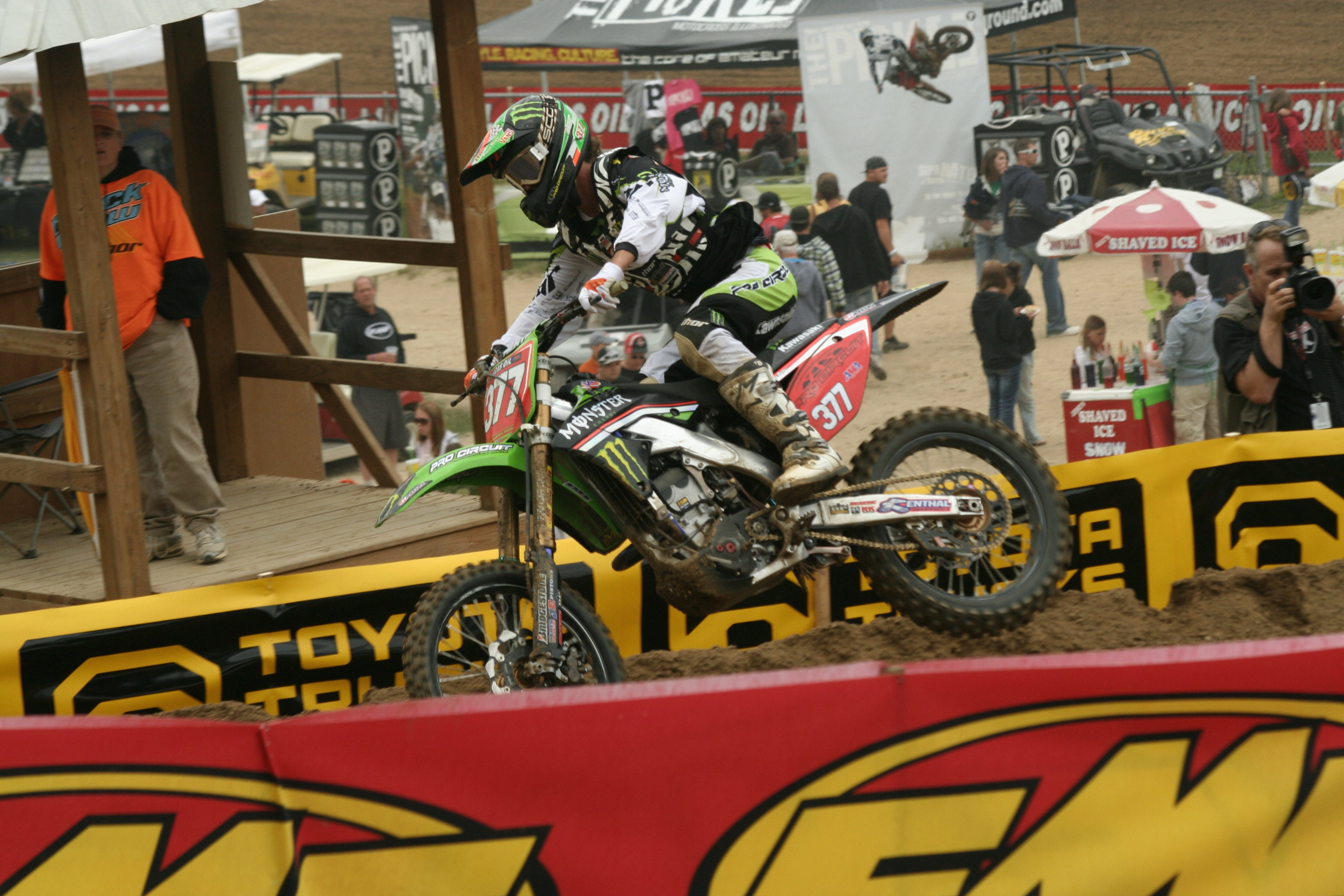
Christophe Pourcel

- Jeremy McGrath
- Christophe Pourcel
- Ricky Carmichael
- Ivan Tedesco
- Grant Langston
- Ben Townley
- Ryan Villopoto
- Adam Cianciarulo
- Mike Brown
- Ryan Hughes
- Dean Wilson
- Blake Baggett

== Results ==
Results for Team Pro Circuit in each year of competition.

Year	Rider	AMA Supercross	Result	AMA Motocross
1991	(United States) Brian Swink	Supercross Lites East	1st	4th
1991	(United States) Jeremy Buehl	Supercross Lites East	2nd	16th
1991	(United States) Jeremy McGrath	Supercross Lites West	1st	5th
1991	(United States) Steve Lamson	Supercross Lites West	3rd	6th
1992	(United States) Buddy Antunez	Supercross Lites West	2nd	16th
1992	(United States) Jeremy Buehl	Supercross Lites East	16th	22nd
1992	(United States) Jeremy McGrath	Supercross Lites West	1st	8th
1992	(United States) Mike Brown	Supercross Lites East	7th	24th
1993	(United Kingdom) James Dobb	Supercross Lites West	9th	11th
1993	(United States) Jimmy Gaddis	Supercross Lites West	1st	22nd
1993	(United States) Mike Chamberlain	Supercross Lites West	8th	22nd
1994	(United Kingdom) James Dobb	Supercross Lites West	6th	6th
1994	(Mexico) Pedro Gonzalez	Supercross Lites West	2nd	13th
1994	(United States) Ryan Huges	Supercross Lites West	4th	4th
1995	(United States) David Pingree	Supercross Lites West	3rd	12th
1995	(France) Mickaël Pichon	Supercross Lites East	1st	5th
1995	(Mexico) Pedro Gonzalez	Supercross Lites West	9th	44th
1995	(United States) Ryan Huges	Supercross Lites West	2nd	2nd
1996	(United States) Casey Johnson	Supercross Lites West	6th	17th
1996	(United States) Chad Pederson	Supercross Lites West	26th	8th
1996	(United States) David Pingree	Supercross Lites West	9th	28th
1996	(France) Mickael Pichon	Supercross Lites East	1st	14th
1997	(United States) Casey Johnson	Supercross Lites West	3rd	6th
1997	(United States) Craig Decker	Supercross Lites West	6th	19th
1997	(United States) David Pingree	Supercross Lites East	16th	14th
1997	(United States) Ricky Carmichael	Supercross Lites East	3rd	1st
1998	(United States) Casey Johnson	—	—	3rd
1998	(United States) Nathan Ramsey	Supercross Lites West	4th	10th
1998	(United States) Nick Wey	—	—	9th
1998	(United States) Ricky Carmichael	Supercross Lites East	1st	1st
1999	(United States) Billy Payne	Supercross Lites West	14th	56th
1999	(United States) Nathan Ramsey	Supercross Lites West	1st	5th
1999	(United States) Nick Wey	Supercross Lites East	2nd	4th
1999	(United States) Shea Bentley	Supercross Lites East	18th	1st
1999	(United States) Scott Sheak	Supercross Lites West	Withdrew	19th
2000	(United States) Billy Payne	Supercross Lites West	10th	—
2000	(United States) Nathan Ramsey	Supercross Lites East	12th	21st
2000	(United States) Nick Wey	Supercross Lites East	4th	9th
2000	(United States) Shea Bentley	Supercross Lites West	1st	6th
2000	(United States) Tallon Vohland	Supercross Lites West	12th	—
2001	(United States) Bobby Bonds	Supercross Lites East	15th	3rd
2001	(United States) Casey Lytle	Supercross Lites West	20th	19th
2001	(United States) Mike Brown	Supercross Lites East	3rd	28th
2001	(United States) Shea Bentley	Supercross Lites West	14th	1st
2001	(United States) Tallon Vohland	Supercross Lites East	5th	34th
2002	(United States) Bobby Bonds	Supercross Lites West	35th	24th
2002	(France) Eric Sorby	Supercross Lites West	15th	27th
2002	(United States) Matt Walker	Supercross Lites West	10th	12th
2002	(United States) Mike Brown	Supercross Lites East	2nd	6th
2003	(France) Eric Sorby	Supercross Lites West	6th	19th
2003	(United States) Justin Buckelew	Supercross Lites East	Withdrew	12th
2003	(United States) Matt Walker	Supercross Lites West	5th	—
2003	(United States) Mike Brown	Supercross Lites East	2nd	—
2004	(United States) Ivan Tedesco	Supercross Lites West	1st	4th
2004	(United States) Matt Walker	Supercross Lites West	52nd	6th
2004	(France) Stephane Roncada	Supercross Lites West	3rd	4th
2005	(South Africa) Grant Langston	Supercross Lites East	1st	4th
2005	(United States) Ivan Tedesco	Supercross Lites West	1st	1st
2005	(United States) Matt Walker	Supercross Lites East	7th	9th
2005	(United States) Paul Carpenter	Supercross Lites West	15th	11th
2006	(New Zealand) Ben Townley	Supercross Lites East	Withdrew	24th
2006	(United States) Chris Gosselaar	Supercross Lites East	2nd	20th
2006	(South Africa) Grant Langston	Supercross Lites West	1st	26th
2006	(United States) Ryan Villopoto	Supercross Lites West	3rd	1st
2006	(United States) Troy Adams	Supercross Lites East	Withdrew	10th
2007	(New Zealand) Ben Townley	Supercross Lites East	1st	2nd
2007	(Australia) Brett Metcalfe	Supercross Lites East	Withdrew	7th
2007	(United States) Chris Gosselaar	Supercross Lites West	5th	20th
2007	(France) Christophe Pourcel	Supercross Lites West	16th	—
2007	(Canada) Darcy Lange	Supercross Lites East	3rd	—
2007	(United States) Ryan Villopoto	Supercross Lites West	1st	1st
2008	(United States) Austin Stroupe	Supercross Lites West	3rd	16th
2008	(Australia) Brett Metcalfe	Supercross Lites West	4th	3rd
2008	(United States) Ryan Villopoto	Supercross Lites East	2nd	1st
2008	(United States) Branden Jasseman	Supercross Lites East	4th	28th
2009	(United States) Jake Weimer	Supercross Lites West	2nd	4th
2009	(United States) Austin Stroupe	Supercross Lites East	2nd	17th
2009	(France) Christophe Pourcel	Supercross Lites East	1st	2nd
2009	(United States) Ryan Morais	Supercross Lites West	3rd	33rd
2009	(South Africa) Tyla Rattray	—	—	28th
2010	(United States) Jake Weimer	Supercross Lites West	1st	11th
2010	(France) Christophe Pourcel	Supercross Lites East	1st	3rd
2010	(Scotland) Dean Wilson	Supercross Lites East	6th	4th
2010	(South Africa) Tyla Rattray	Supercross Lites East	DNR	2nd
2010	(United States) Josh Hansen	Supercross Lites East	6th	DNR
2011	(Scotland) Dean Wilson	Supercross Lites East	2nd	1st
2011	(United States) Broc Tickle	Supercross Lites West	1st	7th
2011	(South Africa) Tyla Rattray	Supercross Lites West	7th	2nd
2011	(United States) Blake Baggett	Supercross Lites East	4th	3rd
2011	(United States) Josh Hansen	Supercross Lites West	3rd	DNR
2012	(Scotland) Dean Wilson	Supercross Lites West	2nd	DNR
2012	(United States) Broc Tickle		9th	5th
2012	(South Africa) Tyla Rattray	Supercross Lites West	15th	DNR
2012	(United States) Blake Baggett	Supercross Lites East	4th	1st
2012	(United States) Darryn Durham	Supercross Lites East	5th	DNR
2012	(United States) Ivan Tedesco	DNR	DNR	17th
2013	(Scotland) Dean Wilson	Supercross Lites East	7th	26th
2013	(Ecuador) Martin Davalos	Supercross Lites West	5th	15th
2013	(South Africa) Tyla Rattray	Supercross Lites West	8th	12th
2013	(United States) Blake Baggett	Supercross Lites West	29th	4th
2013	(United States) Darryn Durham	DNR	DNR	14th
2013	(United States) Adam Cianciarulo	—	—	16th
2013	(United States) Justin Hill	Supercross Lites East	12th	12th
2013	(United States) Tyler Bowers	Supercross Lites East	16th	—
2014	(United States) Blake Baggett	Supercross Lites East	6th	2nd
2014	(Scotland) Dean Wilson	Supercross Lites West	3rd	10th
2014	(Ecuador) Martin Davalos	Supercross Lites East	2nd	DNR
2014	(United States) Justin Hill	Supercross Lites West	4th	14th
2014	(United States) Darryn Durham	Supercross Lites West	21st	DNR
2014	(United States) Adam Cianciarulo	Supercross Lites East	5th	DNR
2014	(United States) Chris Alldredge	—	—	21st
2015	(United States) Joey Savagy	Supercross Lites East	4th	3rd
2015	(United States) Adam Cianciarulo	Supercross Lites East	DNR	14th
2015	(United States) Chris Alldredge	Supercross Lites West	18th	13th
2015	(Switzerland) Arnaud Tonus	Supercross Lites East	19th	30th
2015	(United States) Tyler Bowers	Supercross Lites West	9th	DNR
2016	(United States) Chris Alldredge	Supercross Lites West	12th	26th
2016	(United States) Joey Savagy	Supercross Lites West	2nd	3rd
2016	(United States) Adam Cianciarulo	Supercross Lites East	DNR	8th
2016	(United States) Tyler Bowers	Supercross Lites East	5th	DNR
2016	(Switzerland) Arnaud Tonus	Supercross Lites East	21st	9th
2016	(United States) Austin Forkner	—	—	4th
2017	(United States) Joey Savagy	Supercross Lites East	3rd	5th
2017	(United States) Austin Forkner	Supercross Lites West	6th	13th
2017	(United States) Adam Cianciarulo	Supercross Lites East	2nd	3rd
2017	(United States) Justin Hill	Supercross Lites West	1st	19th
2018	(United States) Joey Savagy	Supercross Lites West	4th	9th
2018	(United States) Austin Forkner	Supercross Lites East	4th	7th
2018	(United States) Adam Cianciarulo	Supercross Lites West	2nd	DNR
2018	(Ecuador) Martin Davalos	Supercross Lites East	14th	DNR
2019	(United States) Austin Forkner	Supercross Lites East	3rd	DNR
2019	(United States) Garrett Marchbanks	Supercross Lites West	10th	14th
2019	(Ecuador) Martin Davalos	Supercross Lites East	4th	18th
2019	(United States) Adam Cianciarulo	Supercross Lites West	2nd	1st
