= Supercross 2000 =

1999 video game

- Developer: MBL Research
- Publisher: EA Sports
- Composer: Jerry Martin
- Platforms: PlayStation, Nintendo 64
- Release: PlayStation: NA: November 11, 1999; UK: December 24, 1999; Nintendo 64: NA: December 3, 1999; EU: February 2000
- Genre: Racing
- Modes: Single player, multiplayer

Supercross 2000 is a 3D racing game based on the sport of Supercross. It was published by EA Sports for PlayStation and Nintendo 64 consoles in North America on October 31, 1999, and in Europe in February 2000. Its sequel, Supercross, was released in November 2000.

== Gameplay ==
Supercross 2000 is licensed by the AMA and Pace Motor Sports. It includes all 16 real stadium tracks from the series, as well as 25 of the Supercross and freestyle riders from the 1999 season.

== Features ==
- Recreations of factory bikes with accompanying physics simulations.
- Play-by-play announcing from ESPN commentators David Bailey and Art Eckman.
- The simulation of tracks wearing down during the course of each race, which gradually develops into grooves and ruts.
- Peripheral support, including support for the Controller Pak, Rumble Pak, and Expansion Pak.

== Riders ==
- Jeff Emig
- Stefy Bau
- Kevin Windham
- Mike LaRocco
- Mike Metzger
- Greg Albertyn

== Soundtrack ==
- The Living End – "Prisoner of Society"
- The Living End – "I Want A Day"
- MxPx – "The Next Big Thing"
- Pulley – "Over It"
- All – "Perfection"
- 40 Watt Domain – "Bubble"

== Reception ==
Reception

Aggregate score
Aggregator	Score	
Aggregator	N64	PS
GameRankings	73%	58%

Review scores
Publication	Score	
Publication	N64	PS
AllGame	3/5	2.5/5
Consoles +	N/A	60%
Computer and Video Games	N/A	3/5
Electronic Gaming Monthly	N/A	17.5/40
Game Informer	6.75/10	N/A
GameFan	82%	N/A
GamePro	4/5	3/5
GameSpot	6.2/10	4.7/10
Hyper	82%	N/A
IGN	8.1/10	4.2/10
Jeuxvideo.com	N/A	10/20
Mega Fun	56/100	51/100
N64 Magazine	76%	N/A
Nintendo Power	7.4/10	N/A
Official Nintendo Magazine	85%	N/A
Official U.S. PlayStation Magazine	N/A	1.5/5
Video Games (DE)	76%	58%
The Cincinnati Enquirer	3/4	3/4

The game received mixed/average reviews on both the PlayStation and the Nintendo 64, according to video game review aggregator GameRankings.
