= Doug Henry (motocross) =

American motorcycle racer

- Nationality: American
- Born: September 6, 1969 (age 57) Milford, Connecticut, U.S.

Motocross career
- Years active: 1988 - 2006
- Teams: Yamaha, Honda
- Championships: AMA 125cc - 1993, 1994 AMA East SX 125cc - 1993 AMA 250cc - 1998
- Wins: 25
Medal record
Representing the United States
Men's motocross
Summer X Games
Gold medal – first place	2005 Los Angeles	SuperMoto
Bronze medal – third place	2006 Los Angeles	SuperMoto
Men's snowmobile
Winter X Games
Gold medal – first place	2019 Aspen	Para Snow BikeCross
Gold medal – first place	2020 Aspen	Para Snow BikeCross
Silver medal – second place	2013 Aspen	SnoCross Adaptive
Silver medal – second place	2015 Aspen	SnoCross Adaptive
Bronze medal – third place	2010 Aspen	SnoCross Adaptive
Bronze medal – third place	2014 Aspen	SnoCross Adaptive

Douglas Howard “Doug” Henry (born September 6, 1969) is an American former professional motocross racer. He competed in the AMA Motocross Championships from 1988 to 2006. He is a three-time AMA motocross national champion. Henry was inducted into the AMA Motorcycle Hall of Fame in 2005.

== Early career ==
Henry was born in Milford, Connecticut and grew up on his parents' farm in the White Hills section of Shelton, Connecticut. The rural area with extensive winding dirt roads was conducive to him learning the sport he would master. He attended Shelton High School. Henry had his first major success in 1993 as a member of Team Honda, where he claimed the 125 East Supercross and the 125 National Championship. In 1994, he repeated as champion in the nationals, beating riders such as Steve Lamson and Ryan Hughes while battling a severe stomach ailment. He later appeared on Fox's first motocross movie Terrafirma. He moved to the premier 250cc division for 1995, where he was immediately competitive, winning Supercross mains and outdoor overalls, before a devastating injury at Budds Creek, Maryland ended his season. Henry was slipping off the back of the bike on the face of a hill, inadvertently applying full throttle, launching him off the hill, causing him to fall from nearly 80 feet in the air to flat ground. Henry's back was broken, but he did not become paralyzed. Henry raced Southwick every year to earn national points and keep his trademark national #19. He regularly finished in the top-five on privateer Yamahas.

== Comeback ==
Henry fought back and wanted to race again. He slowly worked his way back into shape, and Team Yamaha took a chance on him for the 1996 season. By the end of the Nationals, Henry was winning motos once again and had regained his form. For 1997, Yamaha approached Henry with the idea of riding their prototype YZM400 four-stroke in competition. He accepted the offer. While he raced and led the early part of the 1997 Supercross season on a YZ250, Henry complications from a hand injury forced him to withdraw during the middle of the series. He came back riding the four-stroke full-time, and posted top-five finishes at the first few Nationals, which was unprecedented for a four-stroke machine. Henry raced the bike at the final Supercross in Las Vegas, Nevada, and won the race in the prototype bike's first and only start. Tragedy would strike Henry yet again that summer, as he suffered two broken wrists at Budds Creek, mere feet away from the jump where he had his earlier injury. But Henry would battle back again.

In 1998, Henry would race the production version of the prototype four-stroke, the YZ400F. This machine started the four-stroke revolution in motocross. He battled through a strong but unspectacular supercross season where he finished seventh overall. The outdoor season would be Henry's chance to show the bike's true capabilities. After a win at his home track of Southwick, Henry followed up with a triumphant win in Budds Creek, the track where he broke his arms and back. He would go on to defeat Jeff Emig, Jeremy McGrath, Ezra Lusk, Kevin Windham, Mickael Pichon, and Greg Albertyn, earning five overall wins in one of the most competitive seasons ever to take the 1998 250cc National Championship at Broome Tioga Sports Center. He accomplished this with one whole round left.

Having accomplished all his goals, Henry scaled back to a partial schedule for 1999, where he dabbled in snocross for the winter. He returned to the nationals in a farewell tour wearing his #1 plate. He started slowly after taking the winter off, but still managed to score overall wins by mid-season. Henry had been a regular on the AMA Supermoto tour, winning many National events. He gained national attention once again by winning the gold medal in the 2005 X-Games Supermoto race. Henry also won a 2005 Grand National Cross Country enduro race in his first attempt on a stock Honda 450. He followed that with a bronze in 2006.

== Semi-retirement and subsequent injury ==
Henry broke his back on March 4, 2007, in a Supermoto race. He now has partial paralysis from the waist down, and is working very hard toward yet another recovery.

Henry was filmed on September 14, 2009, riding a custom YZ450F and a custom FX Nytro during winter. Henry raced at Winter X-Games 14, in the "Adaptive Snowmobile" class. He took third place.

== Career titles ==
- 1993 AMA 125 Motocross Champion
- 1993 AMA 125 East Supercross Champion
- 1994 AMA 125 Motocross Champion
- 1998 AMA 250 Motocross Champion
- 1998 AMA Professional Athlete of the Year
- 25 AMA Supercross/Motocross overall wins
