= Mike Kiedrowski =

American motorcycle racer (born 1969)

- Nationality: American
- Born: January 13, 1969 (age 57) Canyon Country, Santa Clarita, California

Motocross career
- Years active: 1987 - 1997
- Teams: Kawasaki, Honda
- Championships: AMA 125cc - 1989, 1991 AMA 500cc - 1992 AMA 250cc - 1993
- Wins: 30

Michael Andrew “Mike” Kiedrowski (born January 13, 1969) is an American former professional motocross and enduro racer. He competed in the AMA Motocross Championships from 1987 to 1997. He is a four-time AMA motocross national champion. He is only the second competitor in AMA history after Jeff Ward to win national championships in the 125, 250 and 500 classes. Kiedrowski was inducted into the AMA Motorcycle Hall of Fame in 2007.

== Motorcycling career ==
Born in Canyon Country, Santa Clarita, California, Kiedrowski's father was a desert racer. Kiedrowski began riding motorcycles off-road at an early age and entered his first motocross race at the age of seven. He became a professional motocross racer in 1987. He was hired by Honda and won his first national championship with them by winning the 125cc title in 1989.

In 1991, Kiedrowski was hired by Kawasaki and won his second 125cc national championship. In 1992, he prevailed in a close points battle to win the 500cc national championship by three points over Jeff Stanton. In 1993, he won the 250cc national championship to become only the second rider AMA racing history after Jeff Ward to win national championships in each of the major motocross categories of the day: 125, 250, and 500cc. He was also a four-time member of the U.S. Motocross des Nations team, helping the American team win three of those events.

After his motocross career ended, Kiedrowski competed as an enduro rider for Suzuki in the AMA Grand National Cross Country series. In 2003, he was chosen to represent the United States at the International Six Days Enduro, a form of off-road motorcycle Olympics, and won a Gold Medal at the event. He became one of the few riders to represent the United States in both the Motocross des Nations and the International Six Days Enduro.

Kiedrowski won a total of 30 AMA Motocross and Supercross nationals, ranking him in the top-ten on the all-time combined wins list at the time of his retirement. He was inducted into the AMA Motorcycle Hall of Fame in 2007.
