= Greg Albertyn =

South African motocross racer

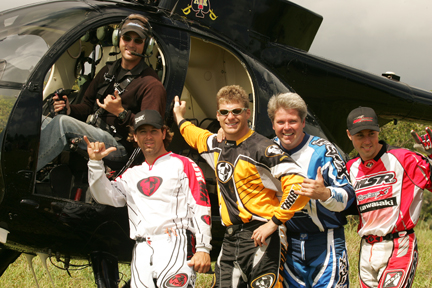
- Left to right: Jeremy McGrath, Greg Albertyn, Ken Faught, Steve Hatch
- Nationality: South African

Motocross career
- Years active: 1988–2000
- Teams: Honda, Suzuki
- Championships: 125cc–1992 250cc–1993, 1994; AMA 250cc–1999
- Wins: 12 (6 AMA)

Greg Albertyn is a South African former professional motocross racer. He competed in the Motocross World Championships from 1988 to 1994 and in the AMA Motocross Championships from 1995 to 2000. Albertyn is notable for being the first South African competitor to win an FIM motocross world championship. He won three FIM world championships and one American national championship during his racing career. He is now a real estate developer in Riverside, California, United States.

== Biography ==
Albertyn won several South African and Dutch national motocross championships before moving onto the World Motocross Championship Grands Prix. Based in Europe, Albertyn and Belgian Stefan Everts had a fierce rivalry in the early part of their careers, with Albertyn usually getting the upper hand. Albertyn won the 125cc World Championship in 1992, and moved to the 250cc class for 1993. Albertyn won that premier class in his first attempt. He successfully defended his championship in 1994. By that time he was already fielding offers to race in America for the AMA National motocross and supercross championships.

Suzuki team manager Roger DeCoster hand picked Albertyn to return his team to the top. Supercross racing was completely foreign to Albertyn, and as he crashed his way through that series, his injuries hampered him for the outdoors where he was expected to shine. He did score a handful of podiums, showing his potential.

1996 was more of the same, with Albertyn only scoring a handful of top ten finishes in supercross. However, he did manage to stay relatively injury-free, and by the time the outdoors rolled around, Albertyn scored his first win at Unadilla and a few more podiums.

Teamed with Jeremy McGrath on Suzuki for 1997, Albertyn greatly improved his supercross technique, and had finally begun to adapt. He won the Supercross season opener in Los Angeles, and scored many other podium finishes. He won the Hangtown National and was very competitive outdoors, but DNFs riddled his season. For '98, Albertyn improved his consistency to finish second outdoors behind Doug Henry.

1999 was Albertyn's most successful year. In the AMA National Championship, Albertyn finished ahead of Kevin Windham, Mike LaRocco, Doug Henry, Ezra Lusk, Jeff Emig, Sebastien Tortelli, Mickael Pichon, Jimmy Button and John Dowd to earn his first AMA title. It was the first premier-class championship for Suzuki in almost 20 years.

Albertyn broke his femur at the 2000 Atlanta supercross. He hastily returned to defend his outdoor title with the rod still in his freshly healed bone. He was very competitive, but could not hold off the emergence of Ricky Carmichael. Albertyn announced his retirement at the end of the season.

Albertyn appeared as a playable character in the 2002 motocross video game Freekstyle.

Today, Albertyn works as a real-estate developer, and still rides regularly. He was one of the original investors in Pole Position Raceway, a chain of indoor go kart tracks created by Ken Faught and Jason Williams. Periodically, he comes out of retirement to race select events. In the last three years, he has scored top--ten finishes in every one of his outings, such as the 2003 Glen Helen National and the 2004 South African Grand Prix.
