= AMA Supermoto Championship =

- Category: Motorcycle sport Motorcycle racing
- Country: United States
- Inaugural season: 2003
- Folded: 2009
- Classes: Supermoto / Supermoto Premier, Supermoto Lites, Supermoto Unlimited, Honda Red Riders Junior Supermoto
- Constructors: Honda · Kawasaki · KTM · Suzuki · Yamaha • Husqvarna Motorcycles
- Last Constructors' champion: (Austria) KTM
- Official website: www.amaproracing.com

The AMA Supermoto Championship was an AMA Pro Racing-sanctioned Supermoto motorcycle racing series that ran from 2003 through 2009. AMA Pro Racing was a wholly owned subsidiary of the American Motorcyclist Association. An amateur national championship, known as AMA Supermoto and sanctioned by the American Motorcyclist Association as AMA Sports, was launched in 2013 with USA Supermoto as the new promoter.

== Classes ==
Main classes consisted of Supermoto (also later known as Supermoto Premier) for 400-450cc, four-stroke, single-cylinder motorcycles, and Supermoto Unlimited, open to two-stroke, single-cylinder motorcycles 490cc and greater, four-stroke, single-cylinder motorcycles. Support classes included the Honda Junior Supermoto Challenge with riders on identically prepared Honda CRF150Fs, and, beginning in 2005, Supermoto Lites for 200-250cc, four-stroke, single-cylinder motorcycles.

== Course design ==
Racecourses were designed with approximately 80% pavement and 20% dirt, with jumps, whoop sections, and a flat-track-style turn. Courses were between .6 and 1.1 miles in length. Tabletop and Kicker "Urbancross" jumps were designed, fabricated, and then built on-site by ASD (a subsidiary of All-Access Staging and Productions) and these added an extra Motocross dimension to the paved portion of racecourses.

== Venues ==
Unique to the AMA Supermoto championship were the use of temporary race venues in addition to traditional, purpose-built courses. Temporary venues such as Mazda Raceway Laguna Seca (unused portion of the racetrack and a parking lot), Reno (public streets), Columbus (public streets and parking lots) Dallas (Reunion Arena parking lot), Las Vegas (Rio Hotel parking lot and Bally's Casino parking lot), Copper Mountain (parking lot) were converted into racecourses complete with dirt sections and Urbancross ramps. Kart tracks (Miller Motorsports Park, Road America, USA International Raceway ) were also used as the tight, winding circuits lend themselves nicely to the agility of Supermoto motorcycles. Dedicated racecourses (oval automobile courses with infield road courses) were also used. Examples include South Boston Speedway, Irwindale Speedway, and Music City Motorplex.

== 2003 Championship Format ==
The 2003 Red Bull AMA Supermoto Championship (6 rounds) was structured in a winner-take-all format in order to attract riders from other motorcycle racing disciplines who may not have otherwise been able to compete in the new series. The first five rounds were used as qualifying rounds for the final round, the Red Bull Supermoto-A-Go-Go held at the Rio Hotel and Casino in Las Vegas, Nevada. Riders and teams were able to participate in the final championship event based on points earned in earlier rounds. Seventy-four riders qualified for the Championship finale. The unique championship format was successful in attracting racers who were competing in other series. Examples include Ben Bostrom, Eric Bostrom, and Jake Zemke (AMA Superbike), Chris Carr, Joe Kopp, Jay Shelton and Roger Lee Hayden (AMA Flat Track), and Grant Langston (AMA Motocross). In addition, many riders who had retired from competition in other disciplines participated in the 2003 series. Among them were AMA Supercross Champion Jeremy McGrath, AMA Flat Track and Superbike racer Larry Pegram, AMA Superbike Champion and Grand Prix racer Doug Chandler, ACU British National Motocross Champion Kurt Nicoll, Grand Prix Champion Kevin Schwantz, AMA Motocross Champions Micky Dymond and Chuck Sun, AMA Superbike racer Mike Smith, FMM Champion Omar Isaak, and French Ice Racing Champion David Baffeleuf.

== 2004–2009 ==
In 2004 and subsequent years, the Supermoto Championship was a traditional cumulative points championship with points from each round contributing to the championship.

== Television ==
The series was broadcast tape-delayed on the Outdoor Life Network from 2003 through 2005, with the 2003 Red Bull Supermoto-A-Go-Go televised live on November 21, 2003.

== AMA Supermoto champions ==
Year	Supermoto	Supermoto Unlimited	Supermoto Lites	Junior Supermoto
2003	1) (United States) Ben Bostrom (Honda); 2) (United States) Doug Henry (Yamaha); 3) (Scotland) Jeff Ward (Honda)	1) (South Africa) Grant Langston (KTM); 2) (United States) Benny Carlson (KTM); 3) (United Kingdom) Kurt Nicoll (KTM)	N/A	1) (United States) Mike Alessi (Honda); 2) (United States) Jamie Siever (Honda); 3) (United States) Aaron King (Honda)
2004	1) (Scotland) Jeff Ward (Honda); 2) (Germany) Jürgen Künzel (KTM); 3) (United States) Doug Henry (Honda)	1) (United Kingdom) Kurt Nicoll (KTM); 2) (United States) Micky Dymond (KTM); 3) (United States) Benny Carlson (KTM)	N/A	1) (United States) Chad Cose (Honda); 2) Justin Hanna (Honda); 3) Taylor Clemons (Honda)
2005	1) (Germany) Jürgen Künzel (KTM); 2) (Scotland) Jeff Ward (Honda); 3) (United States) Chris Filmore (Honda)	1) (United States) Micky Dymond (KTM); 2) (New Zealand) Darryl Atkins (KTM); 3) (Australia) Troy Herfoss (Husqvarna)	1) (United States) Mark Burkhart (Yamaha); 2) (United States) Brandon Currie (Kawasaki); 3) (United States) Joel Albrecht (Kawasaki)	1) UNK (Honda); 2) UNK (Honda); 3) (United States) Michael Johnson (Honda)
2006	1) (Scotland) Jeff Ward (Honda); 2) (United States) Doug Henry (Yamaha); 3) (United States) Chris Filmore (Honda)	1) (United States) Benny Carlson (KTM); 2) (United States) Micky Dymond (KTM); 3) (France) David Baffeleuf (KTM)	1) (United States) Cassidy Anderson (Honda); 2) (United States) Brandon Currie (Yamaha); 3) (France) Alex Thiebault (Husqvarna)	N/A
2007	1) (United States) Mark Burkhart (Yamaha); 2) (Scotland) Jeff Ward (Honda); 3) (Australia) Troy Herfoss (KTM)	1) (United States) Benny Carlson (Aprilia); 2) (United Kingdom) Kurt Nicoll (KTM); 3) (United States) Robert Loire (Husaberg)	1) (United States) Brandon Currie (Yamaha); 2) (United States) David Pingree (Honda); 3) (Australia) Adam Cini (Husqvarna)	N/A
2008	1) (Australia) Troy Herfoss (KTM); 2) (United States) Chris Fillmore (KTM); 3) (United States) Cassidy Anderson (Honda)	1) (United States) Steve Drew (KTM); 2) (New Zealand) Darryl Atkins (Aprilia); 3) (United States) Josh Chisum (KTM)	1) (United States) Brandon Currie (Yamaha); 2) (United States) Matt Burton (Yamaha); 3) (United States) Joel Albrecht (Kawasaki)	N/A
2009	1) (France) Sylvain Bidart (Honda); 2) (United States) Mark Burkhart (KTM); 3) (United States) Brandon Currie (Yamaha)	1) (United Kingdom) Kurt Nicoll (KTM); 2) (United States) Steve Drew (KTM); 3) (United States) Justin Ross (KTM)	1) (United States) Danny Casey (Honda); 2) (United States) Matt Burton (KTM); 3) (United States) Dustin Hoffman (Honda)	N/A
