= Mercedes Gonzalez =

Spanish motorcycle racer

- Nationality: Spanish
- Born: July 11, 1963 (age 63)

Motocross career
- Years active: 1970–1987
- Teams: Kawasaki
- Championships: AMA Women's MX (1984–1991)

Mercedes Gonzalez (born 11 July 1963) is a Spanish former professional motocross racer. Gonzalez was one of the most accomplished female racers in the history of AMA motocross. She was a five-time Women's Motocross Champion at Loretta Lynn’s Amateur Motocross National Championships and a nine time Women's Motocross national champion. Her nine national championships are the most by a female competitor in American motocross history.

== Professional racing career ==
Born in Madrid, Spain, Gonzalez moved to the United States at a young age and began riding motorcycles at the age of 7. Due to the lack of female competitors, Gonzalez often competed against male racers such as future national champions Jeremy McGrath and Mike LaRocco before they became professional racers. Her experiences competing against male racers helped her dominate the women's division of motocross racing.

After dominating women's motocross, Gonzalez made the decision to switch to stadium off-road racing competing in the superlight cars class of the Mickey Thompson off-road series with future NASCAR racer Jimmie Johnson as her teammate. She won a race at Denver's Mile High Stadium to become the first woman to win a Mickey Thompson off-road event.

Gonzalez then started a career in downhill mountain bike racing where, against much younger competitors, she finished second overall to Leigh Donovan at the 1995 UCI Mountain Bike World Championships and, followed with a 6th place finish in the 1996 UCI Mountain Bike World Championships before retiring at the age of 36.

== Later career ==
After her racing career, Gonzalez was hired by Honda to work at the Honda Rider Education Center in Colton, California, where she organizes staff schedules and rider education programs.
