= Jeff Ward (motorsports) =

American motorcycle racer (born 1961)

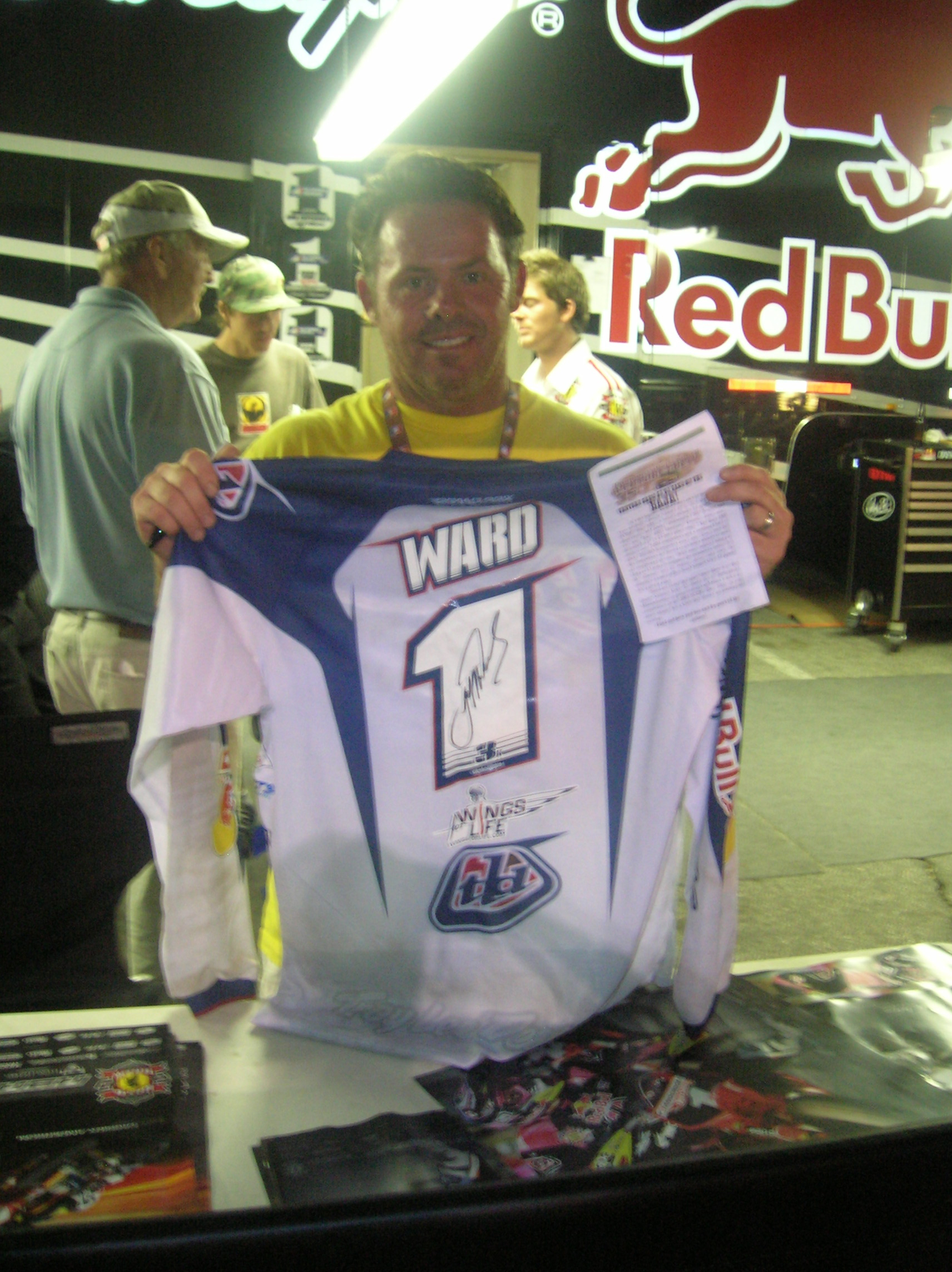
- Ward in 2007
- Nationality: (United States) American
- Born: Jeffrey Ward; 22 June 1961 (age 65) Glasgow, Scotland

Motocross career
- Years active: 1978–1992
- Teams: Kawasaki
- Championships: 125cc (1984); 250cc (1985, 1988); 250 SX (1985, 1987); 500cc (1989, 1990)
- Wins: 56

IndyCar Series career
- 61 races run over 7 years
- Best finish: 1st (2002 Texas Boomtown 500)
- First race: 1998 Indy 200 (Disney)
- Last race: 2005 Indianapolis 500 (Indianapolis
- First win: 2002 Boomtown 500 (Texas)
Wins	Podiums	Poles
1	8	2

Global Rallycross career
- Years active: 2015-2016
- Car number: 07
- Former teams: Chip Ganassi Racing, SH Rallycross
- Starts: 9
- Wins: 0
- Podiums: 0

Previous series
- 2013, 2021 2009 2009 2005 1998–2002 1999 1998–1999 1992–1997: Stadium Super Trucks; Rolex Sports Car Series; Lucas Oil Off Road Racing Series; IndyCar Series; Indy Racing League; NASCAR Featherlite Southwest Tour; NASCAR Winston West Series; Indy Lights

Awards
- 2006 1999: Motorsports Hall of Fame of America; Motorcycle Hall of Fame
Medal record
Representing United States
Summer X Games
Gold medal – first place	2006 Los Angeles	Moto X Super Moto
Gold medal – first place	2008 Los Angeles	Moto X Super Moto
Silver medal – second place	2007 Los Angeles	Moto X Super Moto
- Statistics up to date as of 9 December 2021.

Jeffrey Ward (born 22 June 1961) is a British-American former professional motocross racer, auto racing driver and off-road racer. He won the AMA Motocross Championship five times and the AMA Supercross Championship twice and the Motocross des Nations seven times. After retiring from motorcycle competition, Ward turned to auto racing, garnering three top-five finishes at the Indianapolis 500 (most notably second in 1999) and winning a race at the Texas Motor Speedway. He then competed in off-road truck racing and rallycross. Ward was inducted into the Motorcycle Hall of Fame in 1999 and, was inducted into the Motorsports Hall of Fame of America on 12 August 2006.

== Motocross racing career ==
Born in Glasgow, Scotland, Ward moved to the United States with his family when he was four years old. He began to compete in mini-bike motocross racing in Southern California in the 1960s, just as the sport of motocross was experiencing a burgeoning popularity in the United States. Ward became one of the most accomplished mini-bike motocross racers of his era. He appeared in the 1971 motorcycle documentary film, On Any Sunday when he was ten years old, performing a long wheelie on his mini-bike.

Ward began his professional motocross career in 1978 riding a Suzuki in the 125cc class. The following year, he joined the Kawasaki factory racing team and, would remain with the company for the duration of his motocross career.

Ward won his first AMA national in 1982 and, in 1984 he won his first AMA national championship in the 125cc class, winning eight out of ten races. It also marked the first 125cc national title for Kawasaki. Ward continued to improve in 1985, edging out Broc Glover to win the Supercross national championship and then capturing the 250cc motocross national championship. He competed in both the 250cc and 500cc national championships in 1986, finishing fourth in the 250cc series and third in the 500cc championship. Ward won his second AMA Supercross championship in 1987 over Ricky Johnson however, he finished second to Johnson in the 250cc national championship. The rivalry with Johnson continued in the 1988 250cc motocross national championship with both Ward and Johnson winning three races, but Ward prevailed by seven points to claim the championship over Johnson.

In 1989, Ward finished second to Jeff Stanton in the 250cc national championship but, defeated Stanton in the 500cc championship thus, becoming the first rider to win AMA motocross national championships in the 125, 250 and 500cc classes. He successfully defended his 500cc crown in 1990 then, finished second in the 1991 500cc championship, nine points behind Jean-Michel Bayle. Ward retired from professional motocross competition after finishing in third place in the 1992 500cc national championship.

In fifteen seasons, Ward won a total of 56 national races placing him third on the all-time AMA motocross/Supercross win list at the time of his retirement. He won a total of seven AMA national championships, tying Bob Hannah and Ricky Johnson for the most career motocross and Supercross championships at the time of his retirement. In international motocross competition, Ward was a member of seven winning U.S. Motocross des Nations teams, and a member of two Trophée des Nations winning teams.

== Auto racing career ==
After the end of his motocross career, Ward still had a desire for competition and turned his attention to open-wheel auto racing in the Indy Racing League. He quickly proved to be competitive with a fourth place finish in the Phoenix round of the 1993 Indy Lights season and a third-place finish at the Nazareth Speedway during the 1994 season.

At the 1997 Indianapolis 500 while competing for the Cheever Racing team, Ward qualified on the third row and led the race for 49 laps before finishing the race in third place. His performance earned him the 1997 Indianapolis 500 Rookie of the Year award. He improved to a sixth place finish in the 1998 Indy Racing League season while competing for the ISM Racing team. Ward was contracted to drive for the Pagan Racing team during the 1999 Indy Racing League season and, began the year with a third place at the season opening round at the Walt Disney World Speedway and a second place in Phoenix. He followed this with an impressive second place at the 1999 Indianapolis 500. Ward suffered inconsistent results for the remainder of the 1999 season to finish eleventh in the championship.

Ward won the 2002 race at Texas Motor Speedway for the Chip Ganassi Racing team, marking his first and only IndyCar victory. During his open-wheel auto racing career, Ward garnered three top-five finishes in seven starts at the Indianapolis 500.

== Return to motorcycle racing ==
At the age of 43, Ward returned to motorcycle racing and won the 2004 AMA Supermoto Championship competing against riders half his age. He won a second Supermoto championship in 2006 at the age of 45. Ward also won the Moto X category at the 2006 X Games, becoming the oldest male gold medalist and the oldest Moto X medalist in X Games history. In 2008, he repeated as the winner of the Moto X category of the 2008 X Games.

== Off-road racing ==
From IndyCar racing, Ward progressed to off-road truck racing, competing in the 2009 Lucas Oil Off Road Racing Series for the Speed Technologies team. He also competed in the 2013 Stadium Super Trucks, finishing tenth in the inaugural race at University of Phoenix Stadium. Ward competed in the Global RallyCross Championship for the Chip Ganassi Racing team in 2015, serving as a replacement driver for former motocross racer Brian Deegan.

== Awards and championships ==
=== Awards ===
- Ward was inducted into the Motorcycle Hall of Fame in 1999.
- Ward was inducted into the Motorsports Hall of Fame of America in 2006.

=== Championships ===
==== AMA Motocross / Supermoto ====
- 1984—Won AMA 125cc national motocross title.
- 1985—Won AMA national 250cc motocross and Supercross titles.
- 1987—Won second AMA national 250cc Supercross championship.
- 1988—Captured second AMA national 250cc motocross title.
- 1989—Won AMA national 500cc motocross championship to become first rider in history to win every major AMA national motocross title.
- 1990—Won second consecutive AMA national 500cc motocross championship.
- 2004—Won AMA Supermoto Championship at 43 years of age.
- 2006—Won X-Games Supermoto Championship at 45 years of age.
- 2006—Won AMA Supermoto Championship (second title)
- 2008—Won X-Games Supermoto Championship at 47 years of age (second title).

==== Indy Racing League ====
- 1997—Finished third at Indianapolis 500 in maiden effort, finished 30th in IRL season point standings.
- 1998—Earned career-first pole position at Phoenix IRL race, four top five finishes, finished career-best 6th in IRL season point standings.
- 1999—Finished career-best second at Indianapolis 500, three top five finishes, finished 11th in IRL season point standings.
- 2000—Finished fourth at Indianapolis 500, two top five finishes, finished 11th in IRL season point standings.
- 2001—Two top five finishes, finished 11th in IRL season point standings.
- 2002—Winner of Boomtown 500 at Texas Motor Speedway, finished ninth at Indianapolis 500, two top five finishes, finished 11th in IRL season point standings.

==== Lucas Oil Off Road Racing Series ====
- 2009—Lucas Oil Off Road Racing Series Rookie of the Year
- 2009—Dirt Sports Rookie of the Year
- 2009—2nd Place in Lucas Oil Off Road Racing Series Championship, behind by 1 point

== Racing record ==
=== Complete American Open Wheel Racing results ===
(key)

==== IRL IndyCar Series ====
Year	Team	Chassis	No.	Engine	1	2	3	4	5	6	7	8	9	10	11	12	13	14	15	16	17	Rank	Points	Ref
1996-1997	Galles Racing	G-Force GF01	4	Oldsmobile Aurora V8	NHM	LVS	WDW; 16	PHX														**30th**	**69**	
1996-1997	Team Cheever	G-Force GF01	52	Oldsmobile Aurora V8					INDY; 3	TXS	PPIR	CLT	NH2									**30th**	**69**	
1996-1997	ISM Racing w/ Sinden Racing Services	Dallara IR7	35	Oldsmobile Aurora V8										LV2; 17								**30th**	**69**	
1998	ISM Racing	G-Force GF01B	35	Oldsmobile Aurora V8	WDW; 2	**PHX**; 5	INDY; 13	TXS; 17	NHM; 22	DOV; 19	CLT; 2	PPIR; 20	ATL; 6	TX2; 3	LVS; 21							6th	252	
1999	ISM Racing	G-Force GF01C	35	Oldsmobile Aurora V8	WDW; 3																	11th	206	
1999	Pagan Racing	Dallara IR9	21	Oldsmobile Aurora V8		PHX; 2	CLT; C	INDY; 2	TXS; 18	PPIR; 9	ATL; 26	DOV; 13	PPI2; 23	LVS; 10	TX2; 21							11th	206	
2000	A. J. Foyt Racing	G-Force GF05	14	Oldsmobile Aurora V8	WDW; 7	PHX; 11	LVS; 21	INDY; 4	TXS; 19	PPIR; 15	ATL; 19	KTY; 6	TX2; 8									11th	176	
2001	Heritage Motorsports	G-Force GF05B	35	Oldsmobile Aurora V8	PHX; 7	**HMS**; 5	ATL; 7	INDY; 24	TXS; 16	PPIR; 12	RIR; 8	KAN; Wth	NSH; 20	KTY; 10	STL; 7	CHI; 4						11th	238	
2001	Heritage Motorsports	G-Force GF05B	35	Infiniti VRH35ADE V8													TX2; 24					11th	238	
2002	Chip Ganassi Racing	G-Force GF05C	9	Chevrolet Indy V8	HMS; 4	PHX; 18	FON; 10	NZR; 19	INDY; 9	TXS; 1	PPIR; 20	RIR; 8	KAN; 12	NSH; 11	MIS; 25	KTY; 16	STL; 13	CHI; 21	TX2; 25			11th	268	
2005	Vision Racing	Dallara IR-05	22	Toyota Indy V8	HMS	PHX	STP	MOT	INDY; 27	TXS	RIR	KAN	NSH	MIL	MIS	KTY	PPIR	SNM	CHI	WGL	FON	35th	10	

==== Indianapolis 500 ====
Year	Chassis	Engine	Start	Finish	Team
1995	Lola	Ford-Cosworth	Failed to Qualify		Arizona
1997	G-Force	Oldsmobile	7th	3rd	Cheever
1998	G-Force	Oldsmobile	27th	13th	Team Tabasco
1999	Dallara	Oldsmobile	14th	2nd	Pagan
2000	G-Force	Oldsmobile	6th	4th	Foyt
2001	G-Force	Oldsmobile	8th	24th	Heritage
2002	G-Force	Chevrolet	15th	9th	Ganassi
2005	Dallara	Toyota	31st	27th	Vision

=== NASCAR ===
(key) (Bold – Pole position awarded by qualifying time. Italics – Pole position earned by points standings or practice time. * – Most laps led.)

==== Winston Cup Series ====
NASCAR Winston Cup Series results
Year	Team	No.	Make	1	2	3	4	5	6	7	8	9	10	11	12	13	14	15	16	17	18	19	20	21	22	23	24	25	26	27	28	29	30	31	32	33	NWCC	Pts	Ref
1998	BMR Motorsports	45	Chevy	DAY	CAR	LVS	ATL	DAR	BRI	TEX	MAR	TAL	CAL	CLT	DOV	RCH	MCH	POC	SON	NHA	POC	IND	GLN	MCH	BRI	NHA	DAR	RCH	DOV	MAR	CLT	TAL	DAY	PHO; DNQ	CAR	ATL	NA	-	

==== Winston West Series ====
NASCAR Winston West Series results
Year	Team	No.	Make	1	2	3	4	5	6	7	8	9	10	11	12	13	14	NWWC	Pts	Ref
1998	BMR Motorsports	45	Chevy	TUS	LVS	PHO	CAL	HPT	MMR	AMP	POR	CAL	PPR	EVG	SON	MMR	LVS; 15	75th	118	
1999	Unknown	-	-	TUS	LVS; DNQ	PHO	CAL	PPR	MMR	IRW	EVG	POR	IRW	RMR	LVS	MMR	MOT	95th	28	

=== Complete Global RallyCross Championship results ===
==== Supercar ====
Year	Entrant	Car	1	2	3	4	5	6	7	8	9	10	11	12	GRC	Points
2015	Chip Ganassi Racing	Ford Fiesta ST	FTA	DAY1; 6	DAY2; 4	MCAS	DET1	DET2	DC; 9	LA1	LA2	BAR1	BAR2	LV	NC	-
2016	SH Rallycross	Ford Fiesta ST	PHO1; 7	PHO2; 8	DAL; 9	DAY1; 5	DAY2; 7	MCAS1; 9	MCAS2^{†}	DC	AC	SEA	LA1	LA2	9th	134

^{†}Race cancelled.

=== Stadium Super Trucks ===
(key) (Bold – Pole position. Italics – Fastest qualifier. * – Most laps led.)

Stadium Super Trucks results
Year	1	2	3	4	5	6	7	8	9	10	11	12	13	14	SSTC	Pts	Ref
2013	PHO; 10	LBH; 8	LAN; 12	SDG; 8	SDG	STL	TOR	TOR	CRA	CRA	OCF	OCF	OCF	CPL	16th	69	
2021	STP	STP	MOH	MOH	MOH	MOH	NSH; 6	NSH; 7	LBH; 6	LBH; 7					12th	59	

Sporting positions
Preceded by Tony Stewart	Indianapolis 500; Rookie of the Year; 1997	Succeeded by Steve Knapp
