= James Dobb =

British motorcycle racer

Jamie Dobb
- Nationality: British
- Born: 2 January 1972 (age 54) Derby, England

Motocross career
- Years active: 1988 - 2004
- Teams: Cagiva, Kawasaki, Suzuki, Honda, KTM
- Championships: 125cc - 2001
- Wins: 11

James "Dobby" Dobb (born 2 January 1972) is an English former professional motocross racer. He competed in the Motocross World Championships from 1988 to 1992 and the AMA Motocross Championships from 1993 to 1996, before returning to the Motocross World Championships from 1997 to 2004. He is most prominent for winning the FIM 125cc Motocross World Championship in 2001.

== Biography ==
Dobb was born into a motocross family in Derby, England on 2 January 1972. He excelled at youth level, winning a host of domestic and European youth motocross titles. He turned professional in 1987, aged 15, signing a contract with the factory Cagiva team, widely acclaimed as a future world champion. In 1989, he won his first major adult title, the British 125cc Motocross championship, winning the 250cc category in 1990.

In 1992, Dobb was offered the chance to race in America, for the Pro Circuit-Kawasaki team, headed by Mitch Payton. During his five-year stint in America, Dobb would race for Pro-Circuit Kawasaki, Suzuki America and the Honda of Troy team. Dobb won his first AMA race at the 1993 125cc Unadilla National in New Berlin, New York, defeating Jeremy McGrath and Jeff Emig.

Unfortunately, injury affected Dobb's 1996 season, and he was left without a ride for 1997. Disenchanted with the sport, he briefly pursued a modelling career in New York, before receiving an offer to return to Europe, competing for the Suzuki UK team. Dobb excelled on his return to Europe, winning the 1998 British 125cc Motocross championship, and a best finish of fifth in the World 125cc Motocross championship in 1999. His good form saw him move to the factory KTM team in 2000, a move which gave him the momentum to challenge for the 125cc world title. He was second to fellow KTM rider Grant Langston in 2000, before dominating the 2001 championship, securing his, and Great Britain's, first title in the 125cc World Championship. Dobb's title victory was a welcome relief for British motocross in 2001, with much of the domestic season cancelled due to the country's foot and mouth outbreak.

Dobb moved to the premier MX1 class in 2002, but injury, and an uncompetitive KTM 250 machine, meant that he was unable to challenge Stefan Everts for the title. After a lacklustre 2003 season, he returned to MX2, with the RWJ Honda team for 2004. However, unable to mount a serious title challenge, Dobb retired from professional motocross midway through the 2004 season.

Dobb won 13 individual heat races and 11 Grand Prix victories during his world championship racing career. Along with his 2001 125cc World Championship, he was a three-time 125cc British Motocross Champion (1989, 1998, 1999) as well as a 250cc British motocross national champion (1990). He was a member of eight British Motocross des Nations teams (1989-1992, 1996-1997, 1999-2000).

Since retiring from motocross, Dobb has pursued a successful business career in sports management. He is currently mentoring his motocross protégé, MX2 factory rider Tommy Searle, as he seeks to emulate Dobb in MX2.
