= Jessica Patterson =

American motorcycle racer

- Nationality: American
- Born: 14 September 1983 (age 43) Tallahassee, Florida, U.S.

Motocross career
- Years active: 2000–2013
- Teams: Rick Ware Racing-Honda, Yamaha
- Championships: 2000, 2004-2007, 2010, 2013

Jessica Patterson (born 14 September 1983) is an American former professional motocross and enduro racer. She competed in the AMA Motocross Championships from 2000 to 2013. Patterson was one of the most accomplished female motocross racers in AMA history, winning seven national championships.

== Early life ==
Originally from Tallahassee, Florida, Patterson began riding motorcycles at the age of seven and qualified for her first Loretta Lynn's Amateur Motocross National Championship by age 12.

== Career ==
By the time she became a professional racer in 2000, Patterson had won 42 amateur championships. As a professional rider, Patterson went on to win the AMA Women's motocross national championship seven times starting in 2000. She appeared as a playable character in the 2002 motocross video game Freekstyle. In 2013, she announced her intention to retire from motocross competitions at the end of the season. She then won the last motocross race of her career to clinch the 2013 Women's motocross national championship. Her seven national championships are second only to the nine championships won by Mercedes Gonzalez.

After her motocross racing career, Patterson competed in the Grand National Cross Country enduro championship as well as in Endurocross competitions before retiring in 2015.
