= Freekstyle =

2002 video game

- Developers: EA Redwood Shores, Page 44 Studios (Note: Ported to GameCube by Hypnos Entertainment); Full Fat (GBA)
- Publishers: PlayStation 2, GameCube; EA Sports BIG; Game Boy Advance: NA: Destination Software; EU: Zoo Digital Publishing
- Platforms: PlayStation 2, GameCube, Game Boy Advance
- Release: June 18, 2002: PlayStation 2; NA: June 18, 2002; EU: August 9, 2002; JP: October 3, 2002; GameCube; NA: September 4, 2002; EU: September 20, 2002; Game Boy Advance; NA: August 25, 2003; EU: October 17, 2003
- Genre: Racing
- Modes: Single-player, multiplayer

Freekstyle is a 2002 motocross racing video game for the PlayStation 2, GameCube and Game Boy Advance. There are four levels of gameplay: the circuit, a quick race, freestyle, and free run.

The game features an assortment of real-life FMX riders, which include Mike Metzger, Brian Deegan, Mike Jones, and Clifford Adoptante, as well as professional motocross riders, which include Stefy Bau, Jessica Patterson, and Greg Albertyn. Also featured as a playable character is current 790 KABC radio and sports broadcaster and model Leeann Tweeden, who was also a former motocross announcer.

== Development ==
The game initially started out as EA Sports Supercross 2002, a PS2 sequel to the previous annual games EA Sports Supercross 2000 and EA Sports Supercross, which were both released on the PS1 console.

A playable demo was presented at E3 2001, which followed the directional change exhibited between the previous two games: while EA Sports Supercross 2000 aimed to provide a realistic simulation of supercross, EA Sports Supercross traded realism for a more arcade-like experience. The demo shown at E3 featured only a single freestyle level and no racing features, despite the game title. The demo showcased new features not present on the previous games, including smashable windows and a jump over a two-story house.

The development team noticed players' enthusiasm for the freestyle capabilities of the game and decided to change the planned gameplay in favour of an over-the-top feel, comparable to the SSX series.

== Reception ==
Reception

Aggregate score
Aggregator	Score		
Aggregator	GBA	GameCube	PS2
Metacritic	65/100	78/100	81/100

Review scores
Publication	Score		
Publication	GBA	GameCube	PS2
AllGame	3/5	N/A	4/5
Edge	N/A	N/A	6/10
Electronic Gaming Monthly	N/A	N/A	8.17/10
Eurogamer	N/A	N/A	6/10
Famitsu	N/A	N/A	27/40
Game Informer	7.5/10	8.75/10	8.5/10
GamePro	N/A	4/5	4.5/5
GameRevolution	N/A	N/A	B
GameSpot	6.4/10	7.7/10	8/10
GameSpy	N/A	4/5; 81%	3/5
GameZone	N/A	7/10	N/A
IGN	7.8/10	8.2/10	8.2/10
Nintendo Power	3.2/5	4.2/5	N/A
Official U.S. PlayStation Magazine	N/A	N/A	4/5
The Cincinnati Enquirer	N/A	4/5	4/5
Entertainment Weekly	N/A	N/A	A−

The PlayStation 2 and GameCube versions received "generally favorable reviews", while the Game Boy Advance version received "mixed" reviews, according to the review aggregation website Metacritic. In Japan, where the PS2 version was localized under the name Freekstyle Motocross (Note: Japanese: フリークスタイル モトクロス, Hepburn: Furīkusutairu Motokurosu) and published by Electronic Arts on October 3, 2002, Famitsu gave it a score of 27 out of 40.

Entertainment Weekly gave the PS2 version an A− and said: "With a great two-player head-to-head mode and 100 over-the-top stunts to perform, this makes regular motocross games look downright dull by comparison". FHM gave it four stars out of five and said it had "splendid gameplay topped by highly-involving action and some nice comedy touches". The Cincinnati Enquirer gave the PS2 and GameCube versions four stars out of five: "This title feels as good as it looks thanks to its tight and responsive handling". Maxim likewise gave the PS2 version four stars out of five almost a month before its release date: "Extreme games keep getting extremer, but it would be tough to top this hellish twist on motocross racing".
