= Supercross (2000 video game) =

2000 video game

- Developer: Page 44 Studios
- Publisher: EA Sports
- Platform: PlayStation
- Release: NA: November 29, 2000; EU: February 23, 2001
- Genres: Racing, arcade
- Modes: Single-player, Multiplayer

Supercross, also known as Supercross 2001, is a video game developed by Page 44 Studios and published by EA Sports for the PlayStation in 2000. It is the sequel to Supercross 2000.

== Reception ==
Reception

Aggregate score
| Aggregator | Score |
|---|---|
| Metacritic | 73/100 |

Review scores
| Publication | Score |
|---|---|
| AllGame | 2.5/5 |
| CNET Gamecenter | 7/10 |
| Electronic Gaming Monthly | 6/10 (Note: Two critics of Electronic Gaming Monthly gave the game each a score of 7/10, and the other gave it 4/10.) |
| Game Informer | 5.75/10 |
| GameSpot | 8.7/10 |
| GameZone | 8/10 |
| IGN | 7/10 |
| Jeuxvideo.com | 11/20 |
| Next Generation | 3/5 |
| Official U.S. PlayStation Magazine | 3.5/5 |

The game received "average" reviews according to the review aggregation website Metacritic. Peter Suciu of NextGen said: "Much like with the Knockout Kings series [...] EA Sports has managed to almost make us forget the original, stumbling start with a much improved follow-up."
