= Mike Brown (motorcyclist) =

American motorcycle racer (born 1972)

- Nationality: American
- Born: May 1, 1972 (age 54) Bluff City, Tennessee, U.S.

Motocross career
- Years active: 1990 – 2013
- Teams: Kawasaki, Suzuki, KTM, Husqvarna
- Championships: AMA 125cc - 2001

Mike Brown (born May 1, 1972) is an American former professional motocross racer and Endurocross racer. He was the 2001 AMA 125cc motocross national champion.

== Motorcycle racing career ==
Brown won his first professional race in 1994. In 1999, he finished third in the F.I.M. 125cc world championship. He followed that performance with another third place in the 2000 125cc world championship.

Brown competed in the United States in 2001 and won the AMA 125cc national championship riding for Kawasaki. In 2006, Brown finished 29th in the AMA MX Lites class and 15th in the MX class, racing for Suzuki. In 2007, he returned to Europe to compete in the MX1-GP championship, finishing in seventh place.

After his motocross career, Brown began competing in Endurocross events. He won the inaugural 2009 World Off Road Championship Series (WORCS), becoming the first AMA rider since Mike Kiedrowski to win an AMA National Motocross Championship and a World Off-Road Championship Series title. In 2011 he competed at the Moto X event at X Games XVII and won the silver medal. The following year, he won the Enduro X gold medal at the X Games XVIII. Brown won another silver medal in EnduroX in the 2013 X Games Los Angeles and a gold medal in the 2015 X Games Austin.

Brown is a playable character in the 2004 motocross video game MTX: Mototrax, as well as in the 2001 motocross video game Mx Rider.
