= Rob Herring =

Motocross racer and stuntman

Rob Herring is an English former professional motocross racer and film industry stuntman.

Herring began his racing career in South Africa after his father emigrated there from the United Kingdom. He returned to the U.K. at the age of 17 and won 11 British motocross national championships. He also competed in the F.I.M. motocross world championship. He competed in the 250 world championship from 1987 to 1998, winning 3 GPs and 9 motos, did the 500cc championship in 1999. Herring was a member of the victorious 1994 British Motocross des Nations team that included Paul Malin and Kurt Nicoll. The upset victory marked the first time a British team had won the event since 1967 and, broke a 13-year American winning streak at the Motocross des Nations. as well as finished 2nd in 1986 mx des nations and 3rd in 1992.

After his competitive career, Herring worked as a stuntman in the film industry, working on films such as Casino Royale, the Bourne Ultimatum and Quantum of Solace. Herring was also the manager for the British Motocross des Nations team for seven years before resigning in 2007.
