= Kurt Nicoll =

British motorcycle racer

- Nationality: British
- Born: 15 November 1964 (age 61)

Motocross career
- Years active: 1982–1994
- Teams: KTM
- Wins: 13

Kurt Nicoll (born 15 November 1964) is an English former professional motocross racer.

Nicoll was one of the top riders in the Motocross Grand Prix World Championships during the late 1980s and early 1990s, finishing as the runner up four times in the F.I.M. 500cc world championships. Nicoll won 13 World Motocross Grands Prix and seven ACU British National Championships. Nicoll was a member of the victorious 1994 British Motocross des Nations team that included Paul Malin and Rob Herring. The upset victory marked the first time a British team had won the event since 1967 and, broke a 13-year American winning streak at the Motocross des Nations.

In 2004 and 2009, Nicoll won the American Motorcycle Association's Supermoto Unlimited Championship. He also won the AMA National Vet Championship in Endurocross in 2011 and 2012. He was 2012 AMA Vet Racer of the year. He worked for KTM as their Director of Racing from 1998 until 2009. Nicoll is currently General Manager of Travis Pastrana's Nitro Circus in North America. He is the son of former BSA factory rider, Dave Nicoll. Nicoll also currently runs his own motocross vacation company, Kurt Nicoll's Champion MX Vacations which is based in Temecula, California.
