= Honda CRF150F =

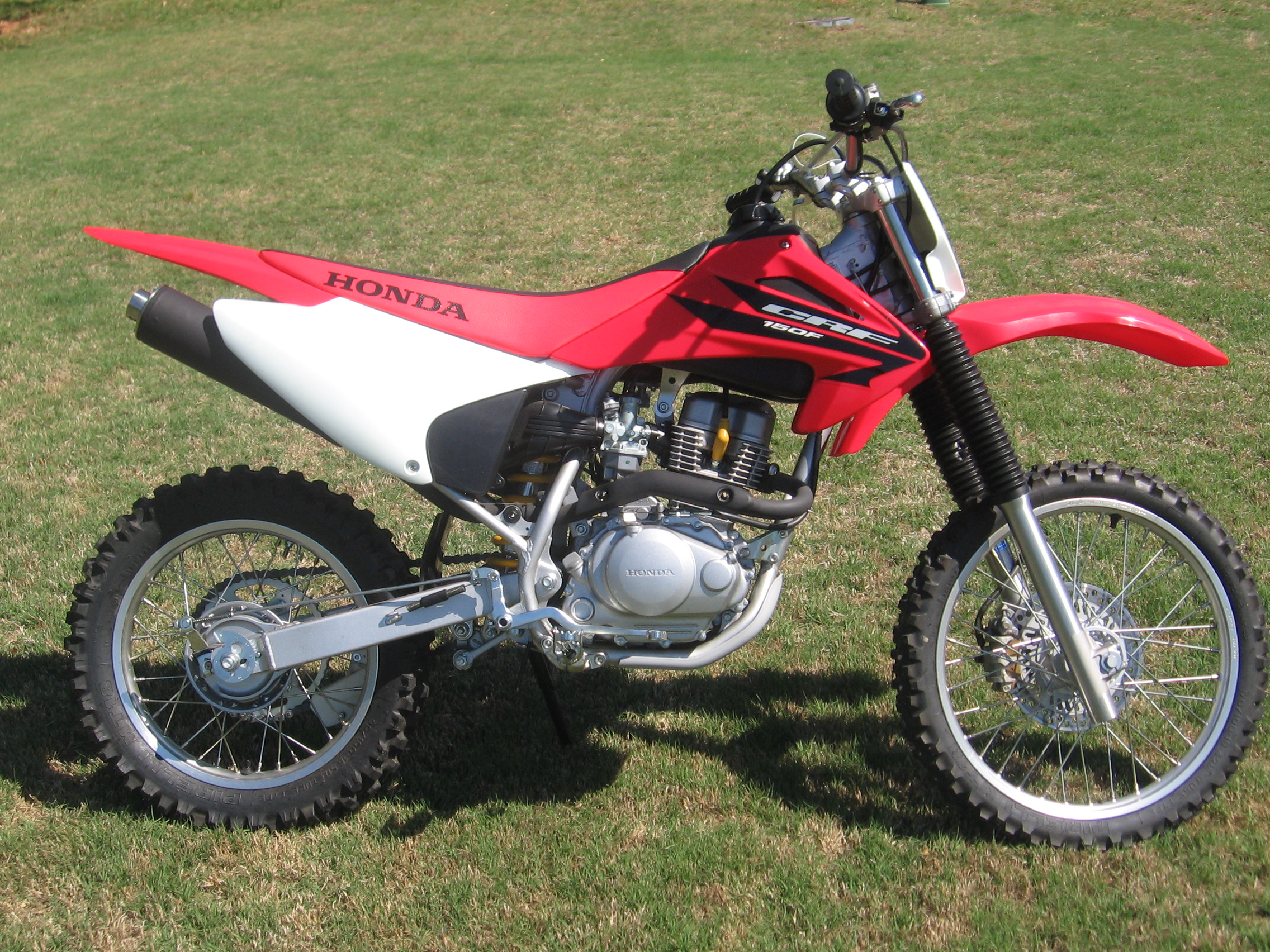
- Manufacturer: Honda
- Production: 2003–2017
- Predecessor: Honda XR125
- Class: Off road
- Engine: 156 cc (9.5 cu in), Air-Cooled, single-cylinder, four stroke
- Transmission: 5-speed manual
- Brakes: Front: 240mm disc Rear: drum
- Tires: Front: 70/100/19; Rear: 90/100/16
- Seat height: 32.5 in (830 mm)
- Related: Honda CRF230F; Honda CRF150R; Honda CRF125F

The Honda CRF150F was an off-road motorcycle that was first introduced in 2003 as the successor to the Honda XR series. The 150F was aimed at beginner to intermediate riders, teens or adults. Its main use is for family recreation and easy off-road trails. It has a relatively soft suspension, wide seat and high ground clearance. This motorcycle's primary design purpose is for trail riding or amateur hair scramble type races. With the manufacturer setup, racing is not recommended. They are known for their reliability and ease of use and maintenance.

== 2003–2005 ==
The 2003 CRF150F was styled after Honda's racing bikes, with tuned suspension and 156 cc (9.5 cu in) engine. It had a 5-speed manual transmission, O ring chain drive, and the Pirelli MT18 tires. The front brake was a 240mm hydraulic disc brake.

== 2006 redesign ==
The biggest change for 2006 was to the engine. In other years, the 150F's engine was a smaller version of the 230F. Less power with almost the same or slightly more weight. In 2006, Honda totally reconfigured the engine with a different compression ratio, 9.5:1, and a bore and stroke of 57.3 × 57.8. The overall weight savings of the new 149 cc (9.1 cu in) were significant with an increase in power as well. Another change was a new electric start system. The battery is concealed under the left sidepanel out of the way from water or mud. With the new light weight engine, the 2006 150F with extra electric start system now weighs about the same as the 2005 model.

In 2017, the CRF150F was discontinued and replaced by the CRF125FB.

== Specifications ==
All specifications are manufacturer claimed.

	2003/2004	2005	2006/2007	2008
Engine
Engine Type	156.8 cc (9.57 cu in) Air-cooled single cylinder four-stroke		149 cc (9.1 cu in) Air cooled single cylinder four-stroke	
Bore/Stroke	63.5 mm (2.50 in) x 49.5 mm (1.95 in)		57.3 mm (2.26 in) x 57.8 mm (2.28 in)	
Compression Ratio	9.0:1		9.5:1	
Valve Train	SOHC; Two-valve			
Carburetion	24 mm piston-valve			
Ignition	CDI			
Drivetrain
Transmission	5-speed manual			
Final Drive	#520 O-ring-sealed chain, 13T/48T			
Chassis/Suspension/Brakes
Front Suspension	35 mm leading-axle Showa fork; 9.1 in (231 mm) travel			
Rear Suspension	Pro-Link Showa single shock; 8.8 in (224 mm) travel		Pro-Link Showa single shock; 8.9 in (226 mm) travel	
Front Brakes	Single 240 mm Disc			
Rear Brakes	Drum			
Front Tire	70/100-19			
Rear Tire	90/100-16			
Dimensions
Rake	26.7 degrees			
Trail	87.0 mm (3.43 in)			
Wheelbase	52.2 in (1,326 mm)			
Seat Height	32.5 in (826 mm)			
Ground Clearance	10.0 in (254 mm)			
Dry Weight	216 lb (98 kg)		223 lb (101 kg)	236 lb (107 kg)
Fuel Capacity	2.17 US gallons (8.2 L; 1.81 imp gal), including 0.4 gallon reserve			1.9 US gallons (7.2 L; 1.6 imp gal), including 0.4 gallon reserve
