= Jeff Stanton =

American motorcycle racer (born 1968)

- Nationality: American
- Born: June 18, 1968 (age 58) Coldwater, Michigan

Motocross career
- Years active: 1987 - 1994
- Teams: Yamaha, Honda
- Championships: AMA 250cc - 1989, 1990, 1992; AMA 250cc supercross - 1989, 1990, 1992
- Wins: 37

Jeffrey Eric "Six Time" Stanton (born June 18, 1968) is an American former professional motocross racer. He competed in the AMA Motocross Championships from 1987 to 1994. He is a three-time AMA 250cc Motocross and Supercross national champion, winning the titles in 1989, 1990 and 1992.

== Biography ==
Jeff Stanton was born in Coldwater, Michigan to Erwin and Mary Stanton. Jeff married Sara Knowles in 1992 and they had a daughter, Siana, in 1996 and a son, Toren, in 1999.

== Racing career ==
Stanton made his professional debut on August 24, 1986 at the Washougal Outdoor National in the 500cc class. Aboard a Yamaha YZ490, he finished seventh overall with 10 - 6 moto finishes. Stanton won the prestigious Daytona Supercross four years in a row, from 1989 - 1992, earning him the nickname "Duke of Daytona" at the time. He retired from professional motocross in 1994.

Stanton rode for Honda for the better part of his career, earning all of his championships with them. Before joining team Honda in 1989, he rode for Yamaha during much of his amateur career and in his first two years as a professional.

In 2000, Stanton was inducted into the AMA Motorcycle Hall of Fame.

Following his retirement, Stanton worked with American Honda as a consultant where he trained the factory riders until he was laid off when the motorcycle industry went through a downturn. He also trained Justin Barcia on private contract from 2012 to 2014. Stanton remains active on the family farm that he grew up on and continues to ride in local races with his son.

Series Standing by Year
	250 SX	250 MX	500 MX
1987	10th	5th	2nd
1988	10th	4th	3rd
1989	1st	1st	2nd
1990	1st	1st	2nd
1991	3rd	2nd	3rd
1992	1st	1st	2nd
1993	3rd	6th	2nd
1994	6th	6th	-

Wins by Year and Series
	250 SX	250 MX	500 MX
1987	0	0	0
1988	0	0	0
1989	5	5	1
1990	4	1	4
1991	4	4	0
1992	3	2	2
1993	1	0	1
1994	0	0	-

== Major Career Titles and Accomplishments ==
1985

- Florida Winter AM 250cc Champion
- Florida Winter AM 500cc Champion
- NMA 250cc Amateur Champion
- NMA 500cc Amateur Champion
- AMA 250cc Amateur Champion
- AMA 500cc Amateur Champion

1986

- CMC 250 Trans-Cal Champion
- CMC 500 Trans-Cal Champion

1987

- AMA Pro Rookie of the Year

1989

- AMA 250 Supercross Champion
- AMA 250 National Motocross Champion
- Team USA Motocross des Nations (MXDN) Championship Team Member
- Mickey Thompson Award of Excellence

1990

- AMA 250 Supercross Champion
- AMA 250 National Motocross Champion
- Team USA MXDN Championship Team Member
- AMA Pro Athlete of the Year.
- FIM Masters of Motocross Series Champion

1991

- Team USA MXDN Championship Team Member

1992

- AMA 250 Supercross Champion
- AMA 250 National Motocross Champion
- World Supercross Champion

1994

- Retired at end of Season to become Team Honda Consultant

2000

- Inducted into Motorcycle Hall of Fame

2002

- Inducted into Red Bud Track & Trail Hall of Fame

2006

- Inducted into Daytona International Speedway Hall of Fame
- Red Bud Grass Race - XR single shock class winner
- Red Bud Grass Race - XR dual shock class winner

2008

- Mickey Thompson Award of Excellence
