= David Bailey (motorcyclist) =

American motorcycle racer

- Nationality: American
- Born: December 31, 1961 (age 64) San Diego, California

Motocross career
- Years active: 1980–1986
- Teams: Kawasaki, Honda
- Championships: AMA 250cc - 1983 AMA 250cc SX - 1983 AMA 500cc - 1984, 1986
- Wins: 30

David Bailey (born December 31, 1961) is an American former professional motocross racer and current television sports commentator. He was one of the leading American motocross and supercross racers during the 1980s. During his eight-year professional motocross career, Bailey won 30 AMA national race victories and won three motocross national championships. His motorcycle racing career was cut short after a practice crash left him paralyzed just before the start of the 1987 season. After his injury, Bailey began a new career as an expert motocross television commentator.

== Biography ==
Born in San Diego, California, Bailey is the adopted son of Gary "Professor" Bailey, also a former professional motocross racer. He began riding bicycles at the age of three, and received his first bike, a 60cc Yamaha at age 10. He started racing that same year. In 1978 he won the 250cc Amateur National Championship on an antiquated Bultaco motorcycle. He turned professional the next year, but had a tough rookie season. For 1980 Bailey joined Kawasaki's Team Green, and was one of the first members of that program. He began showing major potential and earned national #45. 1981 was his last year on Kawasaki, and Bailey moved further and further up the rankings.

Bailey was asked to ride for Team Honda in 1982, managed by multi-time motocross world champion Roger De Coster. That season, Bailey was a member of the Motocross des Nations team and, helped the American team to its second consecutive victory. Bailey joined the team as an alternate for 1982 National Supercross and Motocross champion Donnie Hansen.

In 1983, Bailey won the 250cc Supercross and National Championships, and was awarded the Wrangler Grand National title. He also won the United States motocross Grand Prix (USGP) at Unadilla and repeated as Motocross Des Nations champion. The next season, he added the 500cc National title, won the King of Bercy title and led the US to victory in the Motocross Des Nations for the third straight year. Bailey won many more major races in the next few seasons, most notably two more MXdN titles, and coming out on top of a duel with teammate and fellow champion Rick Johnson at the 1986 Anaheim Supercross. Bailey rode his Honda CR500 to the win at the Motocross Des Nations that fall. The performance by the US team is regarded as one of the most dominant in history.

Prior to the start of the 1987 Supercross season, Bailey was injured in a crash during practice in Lake Huron, California. There was significant spinal cord damage, and Bailey became a paraplegic, paralyzed from the waist down.

Bailey re-emerged in 1994 as a supercross commentator for ESPN and columnist for RacerX magazine. In 1997, he started training for the Hawaii Ironman triathlon. In his first two attempts, he finished third, then second, and finally in 2000 he became Ironman World Champion in his division, 13 years after his accident.

Bailey was inducted into the AMA Motorcycle Hall of Fame in 2004. Bailey continues his role as a TV broadcaster to this day. He is also active in many non-profit organizations dedicated to helping others with spinal cord injuries and contributing to finding a cure.

Bailey became a world-class competitor in chair marathons, and has completed the Hawaii Ironman triathlon several times.
