= Broc Glover =

American motorcycle racer

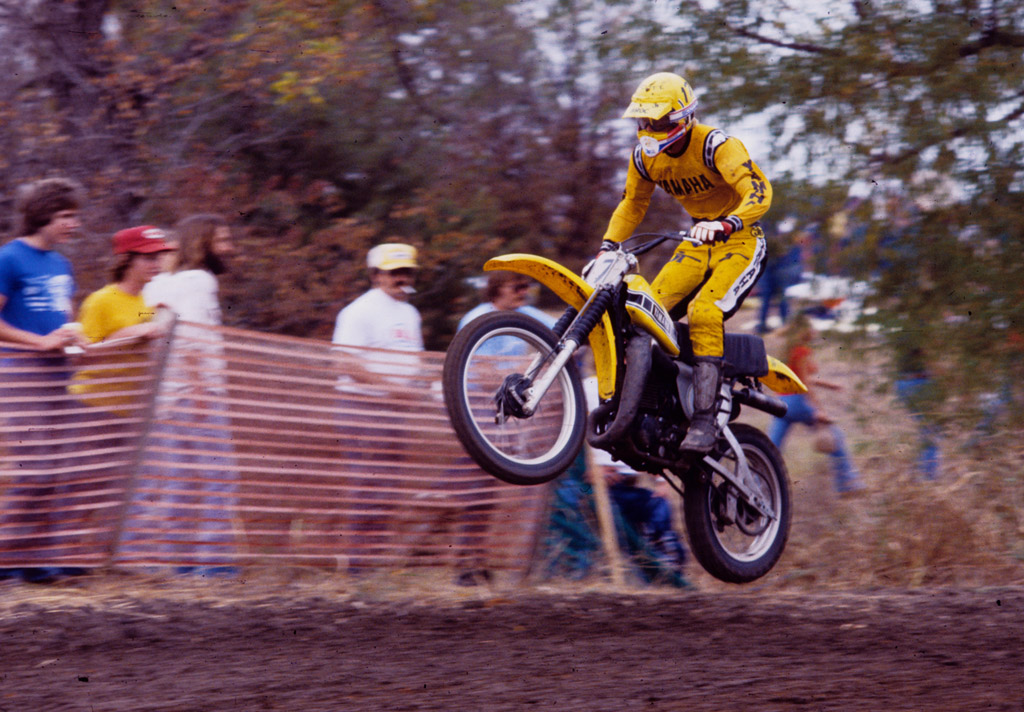
- Broc Glover (17) at the 1977 Rabbit Run Trans-AMA race in Dallas, Texas
- Nationality: American
- Born: May 16, 1960 (age 66) San Diego, California

Motocross career
- Years active: 1976–1988
- Teams: Yamaha
- Championships: AMA 125cc - 1977, 1978, 1979 AMA 500cc - 1981, 1983, 1985 1981 Trans-USA
- Wins: 45

Broc Glover (born May 16, 1960) is an American former professional motocross racer. He competed in the AMA Motocross Championships from 1976 to 1988. Glover earned six AMA national championships, a record which stood for nearly 20 years until 2003, when Ricky Carmichael finally eclipsed the mark.

== Motocross career ==
Born in San Diego, California, Glover won the 125cc National Championship in his first full year riding as a pro in 1977. He defended his crown in 1978 and 1979. He moved to the 500cc class in 1981 and won the national championship in his first year in the class. Glover also won the 1981 Trans-USA series, formerly known as the Trans-AMA series. He added 500cc championships in 1983 and 1985. In 1987, he played a cameo role in Winners Take All as a rich playboy who hates motorcycles. When he retired after the 1988 season, Glover held the AMA all-time wins record in both AMA 125cc motocross and 500cc motocross. Glover won all of his titles riding for the American Yamaha factory racing team.

Glover was inducted into the AMA Motorcycle Hall of Fame in 2000.
