= Jimmy Button =

American motorcycle racer

- Nationality: American
- Born: June 14, 1973 (age 53) Phoenix, Arizona

Motocross career
- Years active: 1990 - 2000
- Teams: Yamaha, Honda, Suzuki
- Wins: 6

Jimmy Button (born June 14, 1973) is an American former professional motocross racer, born in Phoenix, Arizona. He competed in the AMA Motocross Championships from 1990 to 2000.

== History ==
- 1992: Button won his first pro race at the Charlotte and Indianapolis rounds of the AMA 125 East Region Supercross Series.
- 1994: Won the Daytona, Florida, Irving, Texas and Charlotte rounds of the AMA 125 East Region Supercross Series.
- 1995: Finished fourth in the 125 World Motocross Championships.
- 2000: On January 22, Button entered a whoop section of the track at the San Diego round of the 250 cc Supercross Series on his Yamaha YZ426 when he dropped the front wheel and went over the handle bars. The crash broke his neck and caused temporary paralysis. After months of rehabilitation, Button has regained his feeling and movement to live a normal life outside of racing. In July, he helped found the Road 2 Recovery Foundation to help riders suffering from injuries like his. Button also helped forum Action Sports Management to represent riders as an agent.
