= Mickaël Pichon =

French motorcycle racer (born 1976)

- Nationality: French
- Born: 13 February 1976 (age 50) Le Mans, France

Motocross career
- Years active: 1992-2010
- Teams: Kawasaki, Suzuki, Honda
- Championships: FIM 250cc - 2001, 2002; AMA 125cc East SX- 1995, 1996
- Wins: •MX1: 8; •250cc/MX2: 27; •125cc/MX3: 3; •AMA 125cc Supercross: 10; •AMA 250cc Motocross: 1

Mickaël Pichon (born 13 February 1976) is a French former professional motocross and supercross racer. He competed in the Motocross World Championships from 1992 to 1994 and the AMA Motocross Championships from 1995 to 1999, before returning to the Motocross World Championships from 2000 to 2009. Pichon is a two-time 250cc FIM World Motocross Champion & a two-time AMA Supercross 125cc East Chanpion.

== Motocross career ==
Pichon was born in Le Mans, France. He made his world championship debut in 1992 at the age of 16, competing in the 125cc class where he completed the season ranked 19th aboard a privateer Honda. In 1993, he improved to rank fifth in the 125cc world championship final overall results. He also claimed his first AMA supercross victory in 1993 when, he won the 125cc Western Supercross race in San Diego. Pichon won his first Grand Prix race at the 1994 125cc French Grand Prix and, finished the season ranked sixth in the 1994 125cc world championship.

Pichon then moved the United States to compete in the AMA Motocross Championship for the Team Pro Circuit - Kawasaki racing team. In his first full season of AMA competition with Kawasaki, Pichon won the 1995 125cc Eastern Supercross championship and ranked fifth overall in the 125cc outdoor motocross national championship. He successfully defended his crown by winning the 1996 125cc Eastern Supercross championship. Pichon joined the Suzuki factory racing team managed by former world champion Roger De Coster for the 1997 season and, finished the season ranked fourth overall in the 125cc outdoor motocross national championship. He moved up to the 250cc class in 1998 and won the season opening race at Glen Helen Raceway, finishing ahead of Jeremy McGrath and Mike LaRocco. He ended the 250cc outdoor national championship season ranked fourth. In 1999, he joined the Honda factory racing team and finished fourth in the 250cc Supercross national championship. An altercation between Pichon's father and race officials at the High Point Raceway led to Pichon's dismissal from the Honda team.

Pichon then returned to Europe and signed a contract to compete in the 250cc motocross world championship with the Sylvain Geboers - Suzuki team on the recommendation of De Coster. Being dismissed from the Honda team motivated Pichon and he rededicated himself to training. He won the 2001 250cc motocross world championship in a dominating manner by winning ten of the 14 Grand Prix races. He continued to dominate in the 2002 250cc motocross world championship by winning 11 out of 12 Grand Prix races. He won the first three rounds of the 2003 250cc motocross world championship but, an injury forced him to miss the last few rounds of the championship and he finished the season ranked third behind Stefan Everts and Joël Smets.

Later in his racing career, Pichon went to Honda in 2004 and KTM in 2006. While racing for KTM, Pichon became ill. Tests showed that he had mononucleosis. In 2007, he competed in the MX3-GP class, finishing in 25th place. From 2007 to 2009, he competed in the French Enduro Championship. After that, he rode for Honda of France for two years and competed in the Le Touquet beach race. He placed fifth in 2009, and won the event in 2010. Also in 2010, he won the French round of the MX3-GP world championship.

In total, Pichon won 38 Grand Prix races. As of 2019, his 38 Grand Prix victories ranks sixth overall behind Stefan Everts (101), Antonio Cairoli (86), Jeffrey Herlings (84), Joël Smets (57) and Eric Geboers (38).
