= Grant Langston =

South African motorcycle racer

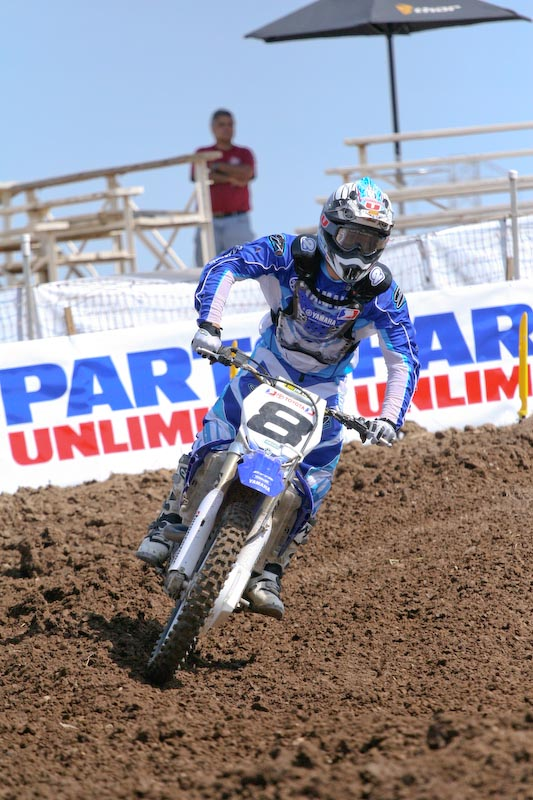
- Grant Langston (2007)
- Nationality: South African
- Born: 17 June 1982 (age 44) Durban, South Africa

Motocross career
- Years active: 1998–2010
- Teams: KTM, Kawasaki, Yamaha
- Championships: 2000 FIM 125cc; 2003 AMA Motocross 125cc; 2005 AMA Supercross 125cc East; 2006 AMA Supercross 250cc West; 2007 AMA Motocross 450cc
- Wins: 7 (FIM)

Grant Langston (born 17 June 1982), is a South African former professional motocross racer. He competed in the Motocross World Championships from 1998 to 2000, and in the AMA Motocross Championships from 2001 to 2010. He was the 2000 125cc motocross world champion and the AMA 450MX national champion in 2007.

== Biography ==
Born in Durban, South Africa, Langston began competing in the world championships in 1998, and by 2000, he had won the F.I.M. 125cc world championship as a member of the KTM factory racing team. He moved to the United States in 2001 to compete in the A.M.A. national championships, winning the 2003 A.M.A 125cc outdoor title and the 2003 AMA Supermoto Unlimited Championship. He also won A.M.A 125 supercross championships in 2005 and 2006. In 2007, Langston won the A.M.A. national championship in the Motocross Class for 450cc machines, riding for Yamaha.

Langston's racing career was cut short due to a cancerous tumor in his eye, diagnosed in early 2008. He made an attempt to return to the sport, but it was short lived. Langston owns a large multi-line motorcycle dealership in Perris, California. He is also a current television presenter for several motorcycle media outlets.

== AMA Supercross/Motocross results ==
Year	Rnd 1	Rnd 2	Rnd 3	Rnd 4	Rnd 5	Rnd 6	Rnd 7	Rnd 8	Rnd 9	Rnd 10	Rnd 11	Rnd 12	Rnd 13	Rnd 14	Rnd 15	Rnd 16	Average Finish	Podium Percent	Place
2001 125 MX	1	1	4	6	OUT	3	1	6	2	1	1	9	-	-	-	-	3.18	64%	2nd
2003 125 MX	2	5	4	11	2	4	2	5	5	5	4	-	-	-	-	-	4.45	27%	1st
2005 125 SX-E	-	-	-	-	-	2	-	1	1	15	2	1	4	-	-	2	3.50	75%	1st
;2006 250 SX-W	4	3	1	15	1	2	-	-	-	-	-	-	-	3	1	OUT	3.75	75%	1st
2007 450 MX	5	6	3	7	6	7	10	2	2	1	1	1	-	-	-	-	4.25	50%	1st
