= Ivan Tedesco =

American motorcycle racer

Ivan Lee Tedesco
- Nationality: American
- Born: August 12, 1981 (age 45) Albuquerque, New Mexico, U.S.

Motocross career
- Years active: 2000 - 2014
- Teams: Yamaha, Honda, Kawasaki, Suzuki
- Championships: AMA SX West 125cc - 2004, 2005 AMA 125cc - 2005
- Wins: 13

Ivan Lee Tedesco (born August 12, 1981) is an American former professional motocross and supercross racer. He competed in the AMA Motocross Championships from 2000 to 2014. Tedesco was the 2005 AMA 125cc Motocross National Champion and was a member of three winning American teams at the Motocross des Nations (2005, 2006 and 2009). He is nicknamed "Hot Sauce", and he raced using the #9.

== Motocross racing history ==
Tedesco was born in Albuquerque, New Mexico. He was not born into a racing family, but began riding with his brother and friends. He began riding motorcycles at the age of eight and became a professional motocross racer in 1999. He was nicknamed "Hot Sauce" by his first team manager, Kenny Watson, because of his south west roots and the similarity of his last name to the brand Tabasco. Tedesco progressed from 125cc class up to the 450cc Supercross division. After moving to the 450cc class, he sustained numerous different injuries which hampered his progress and, he retired from professional racing in 2014 at the age of 33.

== Teams ==
2000–2001: Plano Honda
2002–2003: Boost Mobile/Yamaha of Troy
2004-2005: Pro Circuit/Monster Energy Kawasaki
2006–2007: Makita Suzuki
2008–2009: Red Bull Honda
2010: Valli Motorsports Yamaha
2011-2012: Hart & Huntington Kawasaki
2014: Rockstar Energy Racing KTM

== Accomplishments ==
=== 2010 ===
- 9th Supercross Series

=== 2009 ===
- Member of winning USA team at Motocross of Nations
- 3rd AMA Motocross Series
- 7th 450cc Supercross Series

=== 2008 ===
- 19th AMA/FIM Supercross Series
- 13th AMA Motocross Series

=== 2007 ===
- 5th AMA/FIM Supercross Series
- 11th AMA Motocross Series

=== 2006 ===
- 4th Amp'd Mobile AMA 450cc Supercross Championship
- Member of winning USA team at Motocross of Nations

=== 2005 ===
- AMA 125cc National Motocross Series Champion
- THQ AMA 125cc West Supercross Series Champion
- Member of winning USA team at Motocross of Nations

=== 2004 ===
- 6th AMA 125cc Chevrolet Motocross Championship
- AMA 125cc West Supercross Series Champion

=== 2003 ===
- 8th AMA 125cc Chevrolet Motocross Championship
- 10th AMA 125cc East Supercross Series

=== 2002 ===
- 3rd 125cc West Supercross Series

=== 2001 ===
- 5th 125cc West Supercross Series

=== 2000 ===
- 18th AMA 125cc National Motocross Series
