= Steve Lamson =

American motorcycle racer

- Nationality: American
- Born: March 24, 1971 (age 55)

Motocross career
- Years active: 1988 – 2007
- Teams: Honda
- Championships: AMA 125cc – 1995, 1996
- Wins: 21

Steve Lamson (born March 24, 1971) is an American former professional motocross racer and racing team manager. He competed in the AMA Motocross Championships from 1988 to 2007. He is a two-time AMA motocross national champion.

== Motorcycle racing career ==
Lamson is a native of Orangevale, California where he attended Casa Roble High School. He began competing in the AMA Motocross Championship in 1988. Lamson won the 125cc AMA motocross national championship in 1995 and 1996 as a member of the Honda factory racing team.

Lamson was a member of the victorious American 1996 Motocross des Nations team that included Jeff Emig and Jeremy McGrath. At the 1996 Motocross des Nations in Jerez, Spain, he won the combined 500cc/125cc field in the first moto on a Honda CR125M, becoming the first competitor in Motocross des Nations history to win a moto outright on a 125cc motorcycle against larger machines.

Lamson competed in his final AMA motocross race in 2007 for career that spanned 20 years, one of the longest in AMA history. He was ranked 24th all-time among AMA motocross racers by the online web site Racer X.

After his motocross racing career, Lamson served as the racing team manager for the MDK Honda team and the Star Yamaha Racing Team.
