= AMA Motocross Championship =

American motorcycle racing series

AMA National Pro Motocross Championship
- Category: Motocross
- Region: United States
- Official website: promotocross.com

450 Championship
- Manufacturers: Beta, Ducati, Gas Gas, Honda, Husqvarna, Kawasaki, KTM, Suzuki, Triumph, Yamaha
- Riders' champion: (Australia) Hunter Lawrence
- Makes' champion: (Japan) Honda

250 Championship
- Manufacturers: Gas Gas, Honda, Husqvarna, Kawasaki, KTM, Suzuki, Triumph, Yamaha
- Riders' champion: (New Zealand) Cole Davies
- Makes' champion: (Japan) Yamaha

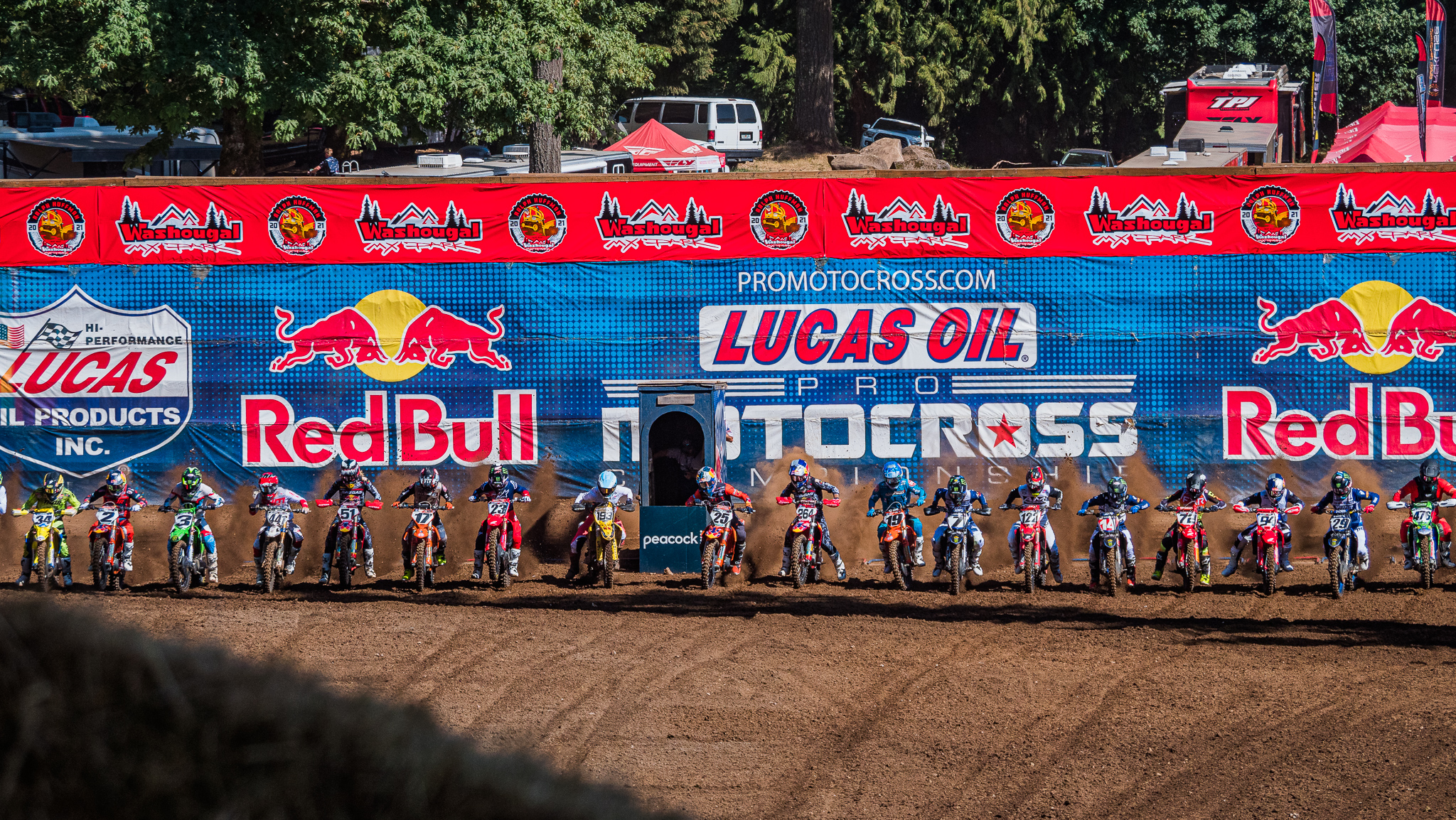

The AMA Motocross Championship (commercially known as Pro Motocross Championship) is an American motorcycle racing series. The motocross race series was founded and sanctioned by the American Motorcyclist Association (AMA) in 1972. The series is the major outdoor motocross series in the United States and is sanctioned by AMA Pro Racing and managed by MX Sports Pro Racing.

== National champions ==
Year	500cc (2-stroke)	250cc (2-stroke)	125cc
1972	(United States) Brad Lackey (Kawasaki)	(United States) Gary Jones (Yamaha)	
1973	(Netherlands) Pierre Karsmakers (Yamaha)	(United States) Gary Jones (Honda)	
1974	(United States) Jimmy Weinert (Kawasaki)	(United States) Gary Jones (Can-Am)	(United States) Marty Smith (Honda)
1975	(United States) Jimmy Weinert (Yamaha)	(United States) Tony DiStefano (Suzuki)	(United States) Marty Smith (Honda)
1976	(United States) Kent Howerton (Husqvarna)	(United States) Tony DiStefano (Suzuki)	(United States) Bob Hannah (Yamaha)
1977	(United States) Marty Smith (Honda)	(United States) Tony DiStefano (Suzuki)	(United States) Broc Glover (Yamaha)
1978	(United States) Rick Burgett (Yamaha)	(United States) Bob Hannah (Yamaha)	(United States) Broc Glover (Yamaha)
1979	(United States) Danny LaPorte (Suzuki)	(United States) Bob Hannah (Yamaha)	(United States) Broc Glover (Yamaha)
1980	(United States) Chuck Sun (Honda)	(United States) Kent Howerton (Suzuki)	(United States) Mark Barnett (Suzuki)
1981	(United States) Broc Glover (Yamaha)	(United States) Kent Howerton (Suzuki)	(United States) Mark Barnett (Suzuki)
1982	(United States) Darrell Schultz (Honda)	(United States) Donnie Hansen (Honda)	(United States) Mark Barnett (Suzuki)
1983	(United States) Broc Glover (Yamaha)	(United States) David Bailey (Honda)	(United States) Johnny O'Mara (Honda)
1984	(United States) David Bailey (Honda)	(United States) Ricky Johnson (Yamaha)	(United States) Jeff Ward (Kawasaki)
1985	(United States) Broc Glover (Yamaha)	(United States) Jeff Ward (Kawasaki)	(United States) Ron Lechien (Honda)
1986	(United States) David Bailey (Honda)	(United States) Ricky Johnson (Honda)	(United States) Micky Dymond (Honda)
1987	(United States) Ricky Johnson (Honda)	(United States) Ricky Johnson (Honda)	(United States) Micky Dymond (Honda)
1988	(United States) Ricky Johnson (Honda)	(United States) Jeff Ward (Kawasaki)	(United States) George Holland (Honda)
1989	(United States) Jeff Ward (Kawasaki)	(United States) Jeff Stanton (Honda)	(United States) Mike Kiedrowski (Honda)
1990	(United States) Jeff Ward (Kawasaki)	(United States) Jeff Stanton (Honda)	(United States) Guy Cooper (Suzuki)
1991	(France) Jean-Michel Bayle (Honda)	(France) Jean-Michel Bayle (Honda)	(United States) Mike Kiedrowski (Kawasaki)
1992	(United States) Mike Kiedrowski (Kawasaki)	(United States) Jeff Stanton (Honda)	(United States) Jeff Emig (Yamaha)
1993	(United States) Mike LaRocco (Kawasaki)	(United States) Mike Kiedrowski (Kawasaki)	(United States) Doug Henry (Honda)

Year	250cc (2-stroke)	125cc men's (2-stroke)	125cc women's (2-stroke)
1994	(United States) Mike LaRocco (Kawasaki)	(United States) Doug Henry (Honda)	
1995	(United States) Jeremy McGrath (Honda)	(United States) Steve Lamson (Honda)	
1996	(United States) Jeff Emig (Kawasaki)	(United States) Steve Lamson (Honda)	(United States) Shelly Kann
1997	(United States) Jeff Emig (Kawasaki)	(United States) Ricky Carmichael (Kawasaki)	(United States) Tracy Fleming
1998	(United States) Doug Henry (Yamaha)*YZ400F	(United States) Ricky Carmichael (Kawasaki)	(United States) Dee Wood
1999	(South Africa) Greg Albertyn (Suzuki)	(United States) Ricky Carmichael (Kawasaki)	(Italy) Stefy Bau
2000	(United States) Ricky Carmichael (Kawasaki)	(United States) Travis Pastrana (Suzuki)	(United States) Jessica Patterson
2001	(United States) Ricky Carmichael (Kawasaki)	(United States) Mike Brown (Kawasaki)	(New Zealand) Tania Satchwell
2002	(United States) Ricky Carmichael (Honda)	(United States) James Stewart Jr. (Kawasaki)	(Italy) Stefy Bau
2003	(United States) Ricky Carmichael (Honda)	(South Africa) Grant Langston (KTM)	(Germany) Steffi Laier
2004	(United States) Ricky Carmichael (Honda)*CRF450R	(United States) James Stewart Jr. (Kawasaki)	(United States) Jessica Patterson
2005	(United States) Ricky Carmichael (Suzuki)*RM-Z450	(United States) Ivan Tedesco (Kawasaki)*KX250F	(United States) Jessica Patterson
Year	450cc (4-stroke)	250cc men's (4-stroke)	250cc women's (4-stroke)
2006	(United States) Ricky Carmichael (Suzuki)	(United States) Ryan Villopoto (Kawasaki)	(United States) Jessica Patterson (Honda)
2007	(South Africa) Grant Langston (Yamaha)	(United States) Ryan Villopoto (Kawasaki)	(United States) Jessica Patterson (Honda)
2008	(United States) James Stewart Jr. (Kawasaki)	(United States) Ryan Villopoto (Kawasaki)	(United States) Ashley Fiolek (Honda)
2009	(Australia) Chad Reed (Suzuki)	(United States) Ryan Dungey (Suzuki)	(United States) Ashley Fiolek (Honda)
2010	(United States) Ryan Dungey (Suzuki)	(United States) Trey Canard (Honda)	(United States) Jessica Patterson (Yamaha)
2011	(United States) Ryan Villopoto (Kawasaki)	(United Kingdom) Dean Wilson (Kawasaki)	(United States) Ashley Fiolek (Honda)
2012	(United States) Ryan Dungey (KTM)	(United States) Blake Baggett (Kawasaki)	(United States) Ashley Fiolek (Honda)
2013	(United States) Ryan Villopoto (Kawasaki)	(United States) Eli Tomac (Honda)	(United States) Jessica Patterson (Honda)
2014	(Germany) Ken Roczen (KTM)	(United States) Jeremy Martin (Yamaha)	(United States) Marissa Markelon (Kawasaki)
2015	(United States) Ryan Dungey (KTM)	(United States) Jeremy Martin (Yamaha)	(United States) Kylie Fasnacht (Kawasaki)
2016	(Germany) Ken Roczen (Suzuki)	(United States) Cooper Webb (Yamaha)	(United States) Kylie Fasnacht (Kawasaki)
2017	(United States) Eli Tomac (Kawasaki)	(United States) Zach Osborne (Husqvarna)	(United States) Kylie Fasnacht (Kawasaki)
2018	(United States) Eli Tomac (Kawasaki)	(United States) Aaron Plessinger (Yamaha)	(United States) Jordan Jarvis (Yamaha)
2019	(United States) Eli Tomac (Kawasaki)	(United States) Adam Cianciarulo (Kawasaki)	(United States) Jazzmyn Canfield (Yamaha)
2020	(United States) Zach Osborne (Husqvarna)	(France) Dylan Ferrandis (Yamaha)	(United States) Jordan Jarvis (Yamaha)
2021	(France) Dylan Ferrandis (Yamaha)	(Australia) Jett Lawrence (Honda)	
2022	(United States) Eli Tomac (Yamaha)	(Australia) Jett Lawrence (Honda)	
2023	(Australia) Jett Lawrence (Honda)	(Australia) Hunter Lawrence (Honda)	
2024	(United States) Chase Sexton (KTM)	(United States) Haiden Deegan (Yamaha)	(United States) Lachlan Turner (Yamaha)
2025	(Australia) Jett Lawrence (Honda)	(United States) Haiden Deegan (Yamaha)	(United States) Lachlan Turner (Yamaha)
2026	(Australia) Hunter Lawrence (Honda)	(New Zealand) Cole Davies (Yamaha)	(United States) Lachlan Turner (Yamaha)

== Most wins by rider ==
Most Championships

450/250 Class	Titles	250/125 Class	Titles	500 Class	Titles
(United States) Ricky Carmichael	7	(United States) Ricky Carmichael	3	(United States) Broc Glover	3
(United States) Eli Tomac	4	(United States) Ryan Villopoto	3	(United States) Jeff Ward	2
(United States) Ryan Dungey	3	(United States) Mark Barnett	3	(United States) Ricky Johnson	2
(United States) Jeff Stanton	3	(United States) Broc Glover	3	(United States) David Bailey	2
(United States) Ricky Johnson	3	(United States) Doug Henry	2	(United States) Jimmy Weinert	2
(United States) Tony DiStefano	3	(United States) Jeremy Martin	2	(France) Jean-Michel Bayle	1
(United States) Gary Jones	3	(United States) James Stewart Jr.	2	(United States) Mike LaRocco	1
(Germany) Ken Roczen	2	(United States) Steve Lamson	2	(United States) Mike Kiedrowski	1
(United States) Jeff Emig	2	(United States) Mike Kiedrowski	2	(United States) Darrell Schultz	1
(United States) Jeff Ward	2	(United States) Micky Dymond	2	(United States) Chuck Sun	1
(United States) Kent Howerton	2	(United States) Bob Hannah	2	(United States) Danny LaPorte	1
(United States) Bob Hannah	2	(United States) Marty Smith	2	(United States) Rick Burgett	1
(United States) Ryan Villopoto	2	(Australia) Jett Lawrence	2	(United States) Marty Smith	1
(Australia) Jett Lawrence	2	(United States) Haiden Deegan	2	(United States) Kent Howerton	1
(United States) James Stewart Jr.	1	(United States) Eli Tomac	1	(Netherlands) Pierre Karsmakers	1
(South Africa) Grant Langston	1	(United States) Cooper Webb	1	(United States) Brad Lackey	1
(South Africa) Greg Albertyn	1	(Scotland) Dean Wilson	1		
(United States) Doug Henry	1	(United States) Trey Canard	1		
(United States) Jeremy McGrath	1	(United States) Ryan Dungey	1		
(United States) Mike LaRocco	1	(United States) Ivan Tedesco	1		
(United States) Mike Kiedrowski	1	(South Africa) Grant Langston	1		
(France) Jean-Michel Bayle	1	(United States) Mike Brown	1		
(United States) David Bailey	1	(United States) Travis Pastrana	1		
(United States) Donnie Hansen	1	(United States) Jeff Emig	1		
(United States) Zach Osborne	1	(United States) Guy Cooper	1		
(France) Dylan Ferrandis	1	(United States) George Holland	1		
(Australia) Chad Reed	1	(United States) Ron Lechien	1		
(United States) Chase Sexton	1	(United States) Jeff Ward	1		
(Australia) Hunter Lawrence	1	(United States) Johnny O'Mara	1		
		(United States) Aaron Plessinger	1		
		(United States) Adam Cianciarulo	1		
		(France) Dylan Ferrandis	1		
		(United States) Zach Osborne	1		
		(Australia) Hunter Lawrence	1		
		(United States) Blake Baggett	1		
		**(New Zealand)** Cole Davies	1		

Most overall wins

Riders in bold have competed in the 2026 Pro Motocross championship

† next to rider's name in the 250/125 Class column indicates rider has competed in the 2026 450 Pro Motocross championship

450/250 Class	Wins	250/125 Class	Wins	500 Class	Wins
(United States) Ricky Carmichael	76	(United States) James Stewart Jr.	28	(United States) Broc Glover	19
(United States) Ryan Dungey	39	(United States) Ricky Carmichael	26	(Netherlands) Pierre Karsmakers	16
**(United States) Eli Tomac**	32	(United States) Mark Barnett	25	(United States) Brad Lackey	16
**(Australia) Jett Lawrence**	28	(United States) Steve Lamson	20	(United States) David Bailey	15
**(United States)** Bob Hannah	27	**(United States)** Jeremy Martin	20	(United States) Jeff Ward	12
(United States) Ricky Johnson	22	(United States) Ryan Villopoto	19	(United States) Ricky Johnson	11
**(Germany)** Ken Roczen	21	(United States) Guy Cooper	16	(United States) Jimmy Weinert	9
**(United States)** James Stewart Jr	20	(United States) Blake Baggett	14	(United States) Jeff Stanton	8
**(United States)** Kent Howerton	18	(United States) Broc Glover	14	(United States) Chuck Sun	7
(United States) Jeff Emig	16	(Australia) Jett Lawrence †	14	(United States) Mike Bell	6
**(United States)** Jeremy McGrath	15	**(United States)** Haiden Deegan †	14	(United States) Rick Burgett	6
**(United States) Chase Sexton**	14	(United States) Jeff Emig	13	(United States) Danny LaPorte	5
**(United States)** Jeff Ward	13	(United States) George Holland	13	(United States) Kent Howerton	5
(United States) Jeff Stanton	12	**(United States)** Eli Tomac †	12	(France) Jean-Michel Bayle	4
(United States) Ryan Villopoto	12	(United States) Jeff Ward	11	(United States) Danny Chandler	4
(United States) Mike Kiedrowski	12	(United States) Mike Kiedrowski	10	(United States) Mike Kiedrowski	3
(United States) Mike LaRocco	11	**(United States)** Ron Lechien	10	(United States) Gary Semics	3
(Australia) Chad Reed	10	(South Africa) Grant Langston	9	(United States) Darrell Schultz	3
(United States) Kevin Windham	10	**(France)** Dylan Ferrandis †	9	(United States) Goat Breker	3
(Netherlands) Pierre Karsmakers	7	(United States) Bob Hannah	8	(United States) Mike Hartwig	3
(United States) Jimmy Weinert	7	(United States) Marty Smith	8	(United States) Bob Hannah	2
(United States) Doug Henry	7	(United States) Mike Brown	8	(United States) Mike LaRocco	2
(Australia) **Hunter Lawrence**	7	(United States) Aaron Plessinger †	8	(United States) Ron Lechien	2
(United States) Marty Tripes	6	(Australia) Hunter Lawrence †	8	(United States) Marty Smith	2
(France) Marvin Musquin	6	(France) Marvin Musquin	8	(United States) Tony DiStefano	2
**(France) Dylan Ferrandis**	6	**(United States)** Micky Dymond	8	(United States) Gaylon Mosier	2
(United States) Damon Bradshaw	6	(United States) Doug Henry	7	(United States) Rex Staten	2
(United States) John Dowd	6	(United States) Travis Pastrana	7	(United States) Barry Higgins	2
**(United States)** Ron Lechien	6	(United States) Johnny O'Mara	7	(United States) Mike Runyard	2
(United States) Tony DiStefano	5	(United States) Adam Cianciarulo	7	(United States) Steve Stackable	2
(South Africa) Greg Albertyn	5	(United States) Joey Savatgy †	7	(United States) Tommy Croft	2
(United States) Jimmy Ellis	5	(United States) Cooper Webb †	7	(United States) Marty Tripes	1
**(United States) Justin Barcia**	4	(France) Christophe Pourcel	7	(United States) Alan King	1
(United States) **Zach Osborne**	4	(United States) Ryan Dungey	7	(United States) Bill Grossi	1
(South Africa) Grant Langston	3	(United States) Erik Kehoe	7	(United States) Rich Thorwaldson	1
(France) David Vuillemin	3	(United States) Kevin Windham	7	(United States) Bryan Kenney	1
(France) Sebastien Tortelli	3	**(Japan) Jo Shimoda**	7	(United States) Denny Swartz	1
(United States) Ezra Lusk	3	(United States) Mike LaRocco	6	(United States) Eric Eaton	1
(United States) David Bailey	3	(United States) Zach Osborne †	6	(United States) Wyman Priddy	1
(United States) Donnie Hansen	3	**(South Africa)** Tyla Rattray	6		
(United States) Broc Glover	2	(United States) Trey Canard	5		
(United States) Marty Smith	2	(United States) Broc Hepler	5		
(United States) Gary Bailey	2	(United States) Ryan Hughes	5		
(United States) Gunnar Lindstrom	2	(New Zealand) Ben Townley	5		
(United States) Sonny Defeo	2	(United States) Robbie Reynard	5		
(United States) Blake Baggett	2	**(Scotland)** Dean Wilson	5		
(United States) Adam Cianciarulo	2	(United States) R.J. Hampshire †	4		
(United States) Mike Alessi	2	(France) Stephane Roncada	4		
(United States) Tim Ferry	2	(United States) Damon Bradshaw	4		
**(United States)** Jason Anderson	2	(United States) Justin Cooper †	4		
(France) Jean-Michel Bayle	2	**(United States)** Larry Ward	4		
(United States) Johnny O'Mara	2	**(United States) Levi Kitchen**	4		
(United States) Josh Grant	1	**(New Zealand) Cole Davies**	4		
(Netherlands) Jeffrey Herlings	1	**(United States) Chance Hymas**	4		
(United States) Ivan Tedesco	1	(United States) Mike Alessi	3		
(United States) Jimmy Button	1	(United States) Danny LaPorte	3		
(France) Mickael Pichon	1	(France) Jean-Michel Bayle	3		
(United States) Jeff Matiasevich	1	(United States) Justin Barcia †	3		
(United States) Alan King	1	(United States) Jake Weimer	3		
(United States) Billy Liles	1	**(United States)** Andrew Short	3		
(United States) Kenny Keylon	1	**(United States)** Damon Huffman	3		
(United States) Steve Wise	1	**(United States)** Donny Schmit	3		
(United States) Ken Zahrt	1	(United States) John Dowd	2		
(United States) Bill Grossi	1	(United States) Shane McElrath	2		
(United States) Rich Thorwaldson	1	(United States) Ivan Tedesco	2		
(United States) Tim Hart	1	(United States) Alex Martin	2		
(United States) John DeSoto	1	(United States) Broc Sellards	2		
(United States) Jim Pomeroy	1	(United States) Eddie Warren	2		
**(United States) Cooper Webb**	1	(United States) Jeremy McGrath	2		
(United States) Justin Bogle	1	(United States) Keith Bowen	2		
(United States) Tallon Volant	1	(United States) Brian Myerscough	2		
(Australia) Brett Metcalfe	1	**(France)** Tom Vialle	2		
(United States) Trey Canard	1	**(Germany)** Ken Roczen	2		
(United States) Tommy Hahn	1	**(United States)** Tim Hart	2		
(United States) Matt Goerke	1	**(United States) Julian Beaumer**	2		
(Spain) Jorge Prado	1	(United States) A.J. Whitling	1		
		(United States) Gaylon Mosier	1		
		(United States) Warren Reid	1		
		(United States) Jimmy Ellis	1		
		(United States) Steve Wise	1		
		**(United States)** Austin Forkner	1		
		(United States) Danny Smith	1		
		(United States) Josh Grant	1		
		(Australia) Craig Anderson	1		
		**(United States)** Jalek Swoll	1		
		(United States) Kelly Smithy	1		
		(Australia) Chad Reed	1		
		(United States) Tim Ferry	1		
		(United States) Nick Wey	1		
		**(United States)** Ty Masterpool	1		
		**(United Kingdom)** James Dobb	1		
		(United States) Scott Sheak	1		
		(United States) **Seth Hammaker**	1		
		**(United States)** Brian Swink	1		
		**(Belgium)** **Sacha Coenen**	1		
		**(United States)** Jeff Matiasevich	1		

== Television coverage ==
=== Current ===
In 2026, there are four broadcast partners from the NBC family of networks: NBC, USA, NBCSN and Peacock.

Network	Coverage
NBC	Two races live
USA	Two races on delay
NBCSN	Every race live, available for YouTube TV and Xfinity customers
Peacock	Every race live, including exclusive coverage of seven rounds

== See also ==
- AMA Supercross Championship
- List of Trans-AMA motocross champions
