= Mike LaRocco =

American motorcycle racer

- Nationality: American
- Born: February 12, 1971 (age 55) Michigan City, Indiana

Motocross career
- Years active: 1988 - 2006
- Teams: Kawasaki, Yamaha, Honda, Suzuki
- Championships: AMA 500cc - 1993 AMA 250cc - 1994 FIM World Supercross - 2000

Michael Wayne “Mike” LaRocco (born February 12, 1971) is an American former professional motocross and supercross racer. He competed in the AMA Motocross Championships from 1988 to 2006. During his nineteen-year professional motocross career, LaRocco won two AMA Motocross Championships and one FIM World Supercross title. He was inducted to the AMA Motorcycle Hall of Fame in 2014.

== Motorcycle racing career ==
Born in Michigan City, Indiana, LaRocco competed professionally from 1988 to 2006. LaRocco began his motocross racing career riding a Yamaha then, signed a contract to race for the Suzuki factory racing team and placed third in the 1990 AMA 250cc national championship.

In 1992, LaRocco switched to the Kawasaki team and won the 1993 500cc Motocross national championship, becoming the final AMA 500cc champion when the AMA discontinued the class after the 1993 season. LaRocco also won the 1994 250cc Motocross national championship, the 2000 World Supercross title and the 2002 U.S. Open Supercross Championship. In 2002, another rider caused LaRocco to crash at a small town Supercross event. The accident caused LaRocco to dislocate his wrist and tear ligaments in his leg. The injury caused him to discontinue the Supercross season, the first time in seven years he had not participated.

LaRocco retired in 2006 with 53 podium appearances in the 450cc class and 16 in the 125cc class. At the time of his retirement, he had finished in the top-five 145 times. LaRocco was inducted to the AMA Motorcycle Hall of Fame in 2014.

== LaRocco's Leap ==
In 1991, a 120 ft triple jump was constructed at Red Bud motocross track in Buchanan, Michigan. It was modeled after "Kong", a large jump found at LaRocco's personal track. Track co-owner Tim Ritchie decided to build a replica of the jump at the Red Bud track. It was later named after LaRocco as he became the first person to clear it, doing so on a 125cc motorcycle.

== Overall season results ==
- 1988
  - 3rd in AMA 125 cc Eastern Region Supercross Series
- 1989
  - 2nd in AMA 125 cc Western Region Supercross Series
- 1990
  - 3rd in AMA 250 cc National Motocross Series
- 1991
  - 5th in AMA 250 cc National Motocross Series
- 1992
  - 2nd in AMA 125 cc National Motocross Series
- 1993
  - 1st in AMA 500 cc National Motocross Series
  - 2nd in AMA 250 cc National Motocross Series
- 1994
  - 1st in AMA 250 cc National Motocross Series
  - 2nd in AMA/Camel 250 cc Supercross Series
- 1995
  - 6th in AMA 250 cc U.S. Supercross Series
- 1996
  - 3rd in AMA 250 cc National Motocross Series
- 1997
  - 5th in AMA 250 cc National Motocross Series
- 1998
  - 3rd in AMA/Mazda Trucks 250 cc Motocross Nationals
- 1999
  - 3rd AMA 250 cc U.S. Supercross Series
  - 3rd AMA/Mazda Trucks 250 cc Motocross Nationals
- 2000
  - 1st Supercross World Championship
- 2001
  - 3rd AMA/EA Sports Supercross Series
- 2002
  - 1st THQ U.S. Open Supercross Championship
- 2003
  - 5th U.S. Open 250 cc Supercross Championship
- 2004
  - 3rd THQ/AMA 250 cc Supercross Series
  - 3rd US Open 250 cc Supercross Championship
- 2005
  - Made 214th AMA Supercross Start
  - 5th THQ/AMA 250 cc Supercross Series
- 2006
  - March 2, After 228 main event starts, LaRocco announced at the Indianapolis Supercross press conference that he would retire at the end of the season.
