= Motorcycle Hall of Fame =

American museum and database

AMA Motorcycle Hall of Fame Museum
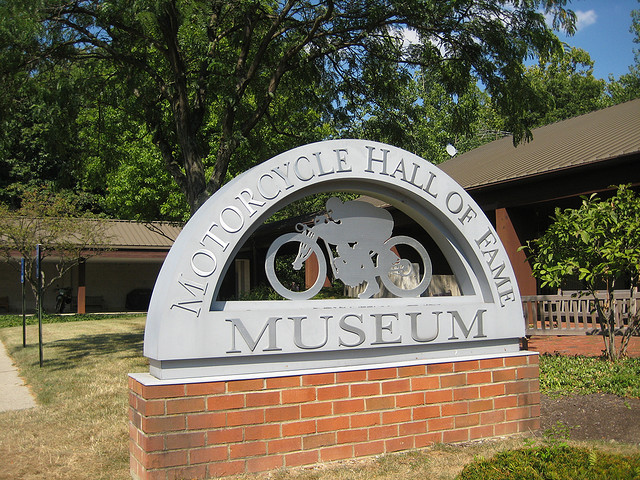
- The Motorcycle Hall of Fame sign
- Established: 1990
- Location: Pickerington, Ohio
- Coordinates: 39.9338°N 82.7834°W
- Type: Transport museum
- Director: Rob Dingman
- Website: AMA Hall of Fame

The AMA Motorcycle Hall of Fame Museum is an offshoot of the American Motorcyclist Association, recognizing individuals who have contributed to motorcycle sport, motorcycle construction, or motorcycling in general. It also displays motorcycles, riding gear, and memorabilia on two floors of exhibits. The American Motorcyclist Association board began planning the museum c. 1998.

The museum is located in Pickerington, Ohio, United States.

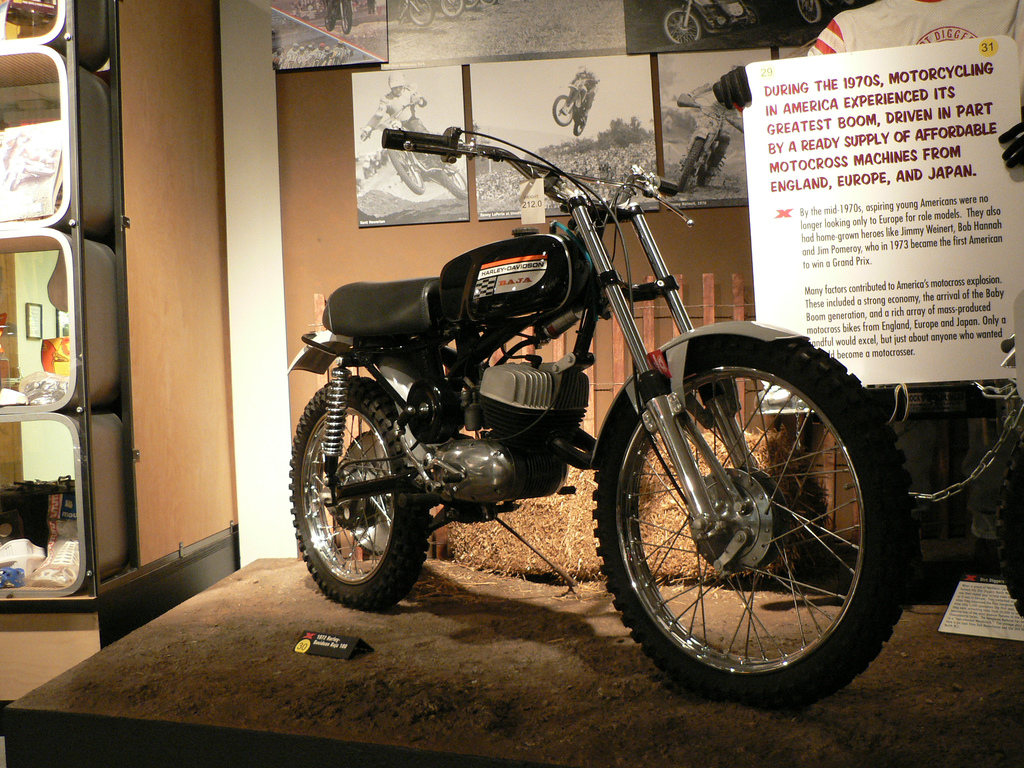
A 1972 Harley-Davidson Baja 100 on display.
