= 1996 AMA Supercross Championship =

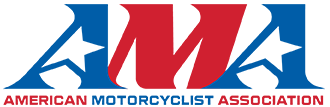
- Organizer: American Motorcyclist Association
- Discipline: Supercross
- Duration: January – May 1996
- Number of races: 15
- TV partner: ESPN

Champions
- 450cc: (United States) Jeremy McGrath
- 250cc West: (United States) Kevin Windham
- 250cc East: (France) Mickael Pichon

AMA Supercross Championship
- ← 1995 1997 →

The 1996 AMA Supercross Championship (also known as 1996 Pace Supercross) was the 23rd season of off-road stadium motorcycle racing in the United States.

Comprising 15 rounds, the series ran from January until May, crowning supercross champions in both the 125cc and 250cc classes, concluding with the Denver round on May 11.

Jeremy McGrath went into the season as the reigning champion in the premier 250SX class and defended his title. Kevin Windham won his first supercross title in the 125SX West class, whilst Mickael Pichon defended his crown in the 125SX East class.

== Schedule and results ==
Jeremy McGrath completed an almost perfect season in the 250cc class, going 14-1 across the 15 races, with his only loss being a second-place finish to Jeff Emig in the penultimate race in St Louis.

=== Race Calendar ===
Round (125 East/West)	Date	Location	Stadium	Broadcast	250cc Winner	125cc Winner
1 (E)	January 13	(Florida) Orlando	Citrus Bowl	ESPN	(United States) Jeremy McGrath	(France) Mickael Pichon
2 (E & W)	January 20	(Minnesota) Minneapolis	Metrodome	ESPN	(United States) Jeremy McGrath	(France) Mickael Pichon & (United States) Kevin Windham
3 (W)	January 27	(California) Anaheim	Angel Stadium	ESPN	(United States) Jeremy McGrath	(United States) Kevin Windham
4 (W)	February 3	(Washington (state)) Seattle	Kingdome	ESPN	(United States) Jeremy McGrath	(United States) Kevin Windham
5 (W)	February 10	(California) San Diego	Jack Murphy Stadium	ESPN	(United States) Jeremy McGrath	(United States) Jeff Willoh
6 (E)	February 24	(Georgia (U.S. state)) Atlanta	Georgia Dome	ESPN	(United States) Jeremy McGrath	(United States) John Dowd
7 (E)	March 9	(Florida) Daytona	Daytona International Speedway	ESPN	(United States) Jeremy McGrath	(France) Mickael Pichon
8 (E/W)	March 16	(Texas) Houston	Astrodome	ESPN	(United States) Jeremy McGrath	(United States) Kevin Windham
9 (E/W)	March 23	(Texas) Irving	Texas Stadium	ESPN	(United States) Jeremy McGrath	(France) Mickael Pichon
10 (E)	March 30	(Indiana) Indianapolis	RCA Dome	ESPN	(United States) Jeremy McGrath	(France) Mickael Pichon
11 (E)	April 6	(Florida) Tampa	Tampa Stadium	ESPN	(United States) Jeremy McGrath	(France) Mickael Pichon
12 (E)	April 13	(Michigan) Detroit	Pontiac Silverdome	ESPN	(United States) Jeremy McGrath	(United States) John Dowd
13 (E)	April 20	(North Carolina) Charlotte	Charlotte Motor Speedway	ESPN	(United States) Jeremy McGrath	(France) Mickael Pichon
14 (E & W)	April 27	(Missouri) St. Louis	Trans World Dome	ESPN	(United States) Jeff Emig	(United States) Nathan Ramsey & (United States) Kevin Windham
15 (W)	May 18	(Colorado) Denver	Mile High Stadium	ESPN	(United States) Jeremy McGrath	(United States) Kevin Windham

== Championship Standings ==
=== 450cc ===
Place	Rider	Team	Points
1	(United States) Jeremy McGrath	Honda	372
2	(United States) Jeff Emig	Kawasaki	240
3	(United States) Ezra Lusk	Suzuki	215
4	(United States) Phil Lawrence	Kawasaki	202
5	(United States) Ryan Hughes	Kawasaki	202

=== 250cc East ===
Place	Rider	Team	Points
1	(France) Mickael Pichon	Kawasaki	232
2	(United States) John Dowd	Yamaha	207
3	(United States) Nathan Ramsey	Suzuki	162
4	(United States) Scott Sheak	Suzuki	137
5	(United States) Brian Deegan	Honda	136

=== 250cc West ===
Place	Rider	Team	Points
1	(United States) Kevin Windham	Yamaha	170
2	(United Kingdom) James Dobb	Suzuki	127
3	(Australia) Kim Ashkenazi	Suzuki	101
4	(United States) Greg Schnell	Suzuki	97
5	(United States) Michael Brandes	Suzuki	89
