= Ernesto Fonseca =

Costa Rican motorcycle racer

Ernesto Fonseca, also known as "El Lobito" and "The Fonz", is a retired professional motocross and supercross racer from Costa Rica.

== Background ==
Born on September 3, 1981, in San José, Costa Rica, Fonseca began riding dirt bikes at the age of five. By the time he was 12 years old, his talent on a motorcycle led him to the United States to race in mini classes. After much success, Fonseca decided to move up to the 125cc Pro class in Costa Rica, where the other top Costa Rican motocross racers, such as Adrian Robert, Rodolfo Peña had tough battles for the championship.

At first, there was a little controversy since MotoClub de Costa Rica has a rule, that the minimum age to ride 125's was 17. In the end M.C.C.R. modified this rule and Fonseca was perfectly legal in the 125cc class. It was in his first exhibition race in la Guácima where Fonseca showed his talent by beating Adrian Robert. From here on, Ernesto and Adrian Robert were the fans favorites and the all time contenders for the 125cc & 250cc class titles, battling one each other race after race. Fonseca's dominance also gave him several 125cc Latin American motocross championships. Fonseca kept a busy schedule competing in winter Olympics and Loretta Lynn's amateur motocross championships where he met his long-time friend Ricky Carmichael. In 1999, Phil Alderton and Erik Kehoe of Yamaha of Troy would hire him to race the AMA Supercross Series East.

Soon, Fonseca started AMA motocross. AMA Pro Racing, and Yamaha of Troy (Y.O.T.), embraced him and made him feel at home. A confidence boost for Ernesto was also that he was understudy of names like Jeremy McGrath, Jimmy Button & others.

The season proved successful for Fonseca, as he ended up winning the first five rounds of the series, and the championship. For this, Fonseca was named the 1999 AMA Rookie of the Year award and he went on to win the 125 East division championship (first championship for Yamaha of Troy as a Team) aboard a Yamaha YZ125. Fonseca's second season at Y.O.T. was full of struggles as he adapted from two to four-stroke bikes. In his third season, now accustomed to his four-stroke bike and the different riding it requires, he went on to win the west conference championship. He became the first rider to win both East and West division championships.

As AMA rules state a rider must move to the 250cc Supercross class if they have won two 125cc Supercross championships, Fonseca joined the American Honda factory racing team in 2002 joining long-time friend Ricky Carmichael. At Honda, Carmichael helped Fonseca immensely, helping him improve in the outdoor motocross championship. This was reflected by Fonseca usually finishing in the top-five.

Fonseca's career came to an end due to a practice crash that broke cervicals C5, C6 and C7. Fonseca, a tough rider, remains a Costa Rican motocross legend.

== Injury ==
As well known as the dangers of motocross are, the entire motocross world was stunned to hear on March 7, 2006, Fonseca was injured while practicing on his private track. Landing on his head, he fractured the C-7 vertebrae and bruised his spine. Just two days after the accident, doctors performed what was described as a successful surgery and on April 13, 2006, he was transferred to Colorado for rehabilitation.

The accident left Fonseca without feeling from the chest down. At only 25 years old, he had already become a notable figure in the sport, known for his outgoing personality. As a result, many showed their love and support for him, often by sending greeting cards from various countries all over the world.

On May 5, 2006, The Road 2 Recovery Foundation paired up with the Women's Motocross & Supercross Foundation for their Seventh Annual 'Slots of Golf' Supercross Celebrity Golf Classic, to benefit Fonseca. The event pairs celebrities of the sport with fans for a golf game at Badlands Golf Course.

On May 21, 2006, the Dirt Diggers North MC, promoter of the AMA National Hangtown Motocross Classic, started a recovery fund for Fonseca, presenting him with a check at the AMA National at Thunder Valley in CO that summer. The Dirt Diggers North MC, through the Hangtown Motocross Classic, will continue to accept donations to Fonseca at its annual event.

He has since become a part of the Costa Rica Paralympic Games team, and has trained for the marathon and triathlon sections.

== Career overview ==
2005

- 6th AMA 250 Supercross Series
- 3rd AMA 250 National Motocross Series

2004

- 27th AMA 250 Supercross Series [missed most of season due to injury]
- 5th AMA 250 National Motocross Series

2003

- 3rd AMA 250 Supercross Series
- 8th AMA 250 National Motocross Series

2002

- 7th AMA 250 Supercross Series
- 4th AMA 125 National Motocross Series

2001

- 1st AMA 125 Western Region Supercross Series
- 8th AMA 125 East/West Supercross Shootout
- 3rd AMA 125 National Motocross Series

2000

- 5th AMA 125 Eastern Region Supercross Series
- 7th AMA 125 National Motocross Series

1999

- 1st AMA 125 Eastern Region Supercross Series
- 8th AMA 125 National Motocross Series
- 1999 AMA Rookie of the Year

Fonseca was a judge when the X fighter Jeremy Lusk died.
