= David Vuillemin =

French motorcycle racer (born 1977)

- Nationality: French
- Born: 18 October 1977 (age 48) Berre-l'Étang, Bouches-du-Rhône, France

Motocross career
- Years active: 1995 - 2009
- Teams: Yamaha, Honda, Kawasaki
- Championships: FIM World Supercross Champion - 1999
- Wins: 6 FIM, 7 AMA Supercross, 3 AMA Motocross
- GP debut: 1995 125cc Spanish Grand Prix Bellpuig
- First GP win: 1998 125cc Belgian Grand Prix Nismes

David Vuillemin (born 18 October 1977) is a French former professional motocross and supercross racer. He competed in the Motocross World Championships from 1995 to 1999 and won the 1999 supercross world championship. He competed in the AMA Motocross Championships from 2000 and 2008 before returning to the Motocross World Championships for one final season in 2009. Although Vuillemin never won a major championship, he was twice the runner-up in the AMA Supercross championships and, was one of the few competitors who could beat both Jeremy McGrath and Ricky Carmichael in their prime.

== Motocross racing career ==
=== World championship career ===
Born in Berre-l'Étang, Bouches-du-Rhône, Vuillemin began riding motorcycles as a child because his father was a motorcycle road racer but, he preferred to play football. He began motocross racing in 1985 and made his world championship debut riding a Kawasaki in the 1995 125cc motocross world championship, finishing the season ranked 31st.

Vuillemin made his first AMA motocross race appearance when he competed in three rounds of the 1996 AMA 125cc Western Supercross championship. In the 1996 125cc motocross world championship, his results improved with a 16th place finish. Vuillemin returned to compete in the 1997 AMA 125cc Western Supercross championship competing as a privateer with assistance from the FMF racing team. He posted first and second place finishes in six races and, was ranked fourth in the championship final overall standings. Riding for the Yamaha of France racing team in the 1997 125cc world championships, he ended the year ranked sixth in the final overall standings.

Vuillemin began the 1998 season in the AMA 125cc Western Supercross championship where, he scored three consecutive victories and finished second to John Dowd in the championship final overall standings. 1998 marked the best year of his 125cc career as, he won three consecutive Grand Prix races as well as a fourth victory later on to end the season ranked second in the 125cc motocross world championship behind the defending champion Alessio Chiodi.

Vuillemin moved up to the 250cc class in 1999 appearing in five rounds of the AMA Supercross championship including his best result at the San Diego Supercross where he led the main event for 14 laps ahead of Jeremy McGrath and Ezra Lusk on a mostly unmodified Yamaha YZ 250 and, finished the race in fourth place. His impressive performance earned him an offer to race in the United States in 2000.

Vuillamin won his first major championship in 1999 when he claimed the short, three-round World Supercross Series championship ahead of second place finisher Sébastien Tortelli. In the 1999 250cc world championship, he won two Grand Prix races to end the season ranked third in the championship.

=== AMA career ===
Vuillemin joined the Yamaha USA factory racing team to compete in the 2000 AMA Motocross Championships. He began the 250cc Supercross season with a fifth place in the opening round, followed by a second place before scoring his first victory in the third round in San Diego when McGrath experienced mechanical troubles. At the fourth round in Phoenix, Vuillemin came from behind to pass several top competitors including the previously dominant McGrath to score an impressive victory. It marked the first time that a competitor had been able to catch and pass McGrath from behind. He won two more supercross events to finish the season ranked second behind defending champion McGrath.

In the 2000 250cc outdoor motocross national championship, Vuillemin won the Hangtown motocross national over an impressive field of competitors including Ricky Carmichael, Kevin Windham Sebastian Tortelli and Greg Albertyn. He followed with another victory at the next race at High Point Raceway but, then Carmichael dominated the remainder of the season with Vuillemin ranked fourth in the final overall standings.

Vuillemin's 2001 season was hampered by injuries but, he was able to repeat as winner of the High Point Raceway national race. In September 2001, Vuillemin joined Yves Demaria and Luigi Séguy as members of the French team competing in the Motocross des Nations event held at the hilltop Citadel of Namur motocross circuit. He scored a third and fourth place results to help the French team win their first Motocross des Nations event since its inception in 1947.

Vuillemin had another strong performance in the 2002 250cc Supercross championship, winning the opening round and then winning two more rounds including an impressive victory when he caught and passed Travis Pastrana and Carmichael late in the race. He earned another 10 additional podium finishes and led Carmichael for half the season until the Daytona round when he was injured in a practice crash that would prevent him from racing and allowed Carmichael to take over the championship points lead. He finished the supercross season ranked second behind Carmichael. His performance earned him the "Comeback Rider of the Year Award" at the season ending AMA Awards banquet.

Vuillemin raced a limited season in the AMA 250cc outdoor motocross championship after re-injuring his shoulder and forcing him to have surgery. He did however earn an overall second-place finish at Sacramento. In 2003, Vuillemin raced a limited AMA 250cc Supercross season. He earned five podium finishes before breaking his back in the Daytona round putting him out for the remainder of the series. He contested the AMA 250cc outdoor motocross championship, earning five overall top-five finishes. Vuillemin contested the AMA 250cc Supercross series in 2004, earning seven podium finishes. He also raced in the AMA 250cc outdoor motocross championship, earning two overall podium finishes. He posted similar results in 2005, fourth place in AMA Supercross series and fourth in AMA outdoor motocross with the Yamaha Factory Racing Team.

For the 2006 season, Vuillemin rode for the Honda team but left the team due to differences of opinion with his team manager and, began competing as a privateer, riding a Yamaha YZ 450F. His improved results placed him seventh overall and first privateer. His best finish came at the Millville round with a 2nd place overall behind Ricky Carmichael and ahead of James "Bubba" Stewart. It should be noted, this is the infamous race where Ricky Carmichael lapped the entire field.

Vuillemin switched to the MDK Honda team managed by former national champion Steve Lamson in 2007. His first race with the team came at the US Open in Las Vegas where, he led Carmichael and Stewart for half the race before falling to third where he would finish. Vuillemin finished sixth in the American Supercross Championship earning him the Top Privateer Award. He was seriously injured at the Millville round of the 450cc outdoor motocross championship and finished the season ranked tenth in the final overall standings. Vuillemin was never able to regain his successful form after his Millville accident.

In the 2008 season, Vuillemin earned his way back to a Factory team racing for the Suzuki factory racing team managed by former world champion Roger De Coster in the Supercross and 450cc outdoor motocross nationals however, his season was marred by injuries and he made the decision to retire after finishing eighth in the 2008 450cc Supercross championship.

=== Return to Grand Prix competition ===
Vuillemin then reversed course and decided to return to Europe to compete with a Kawasaki in the MX1 Motocross World Championships for one final season in 2009. He suffered from sub-par equipment in comparison to his factory-sponsored opposition and finished the season ranked 13th in the world. He then made the decision to retire permanently from professional motocross competition.

=== Career overview ===
Vuillemin is a seven-time Supercross winner and three-time outdoor motocross winner. He has more than 40 podium finishes to his credit, and he was the top Supercross privateer in 2007 and the top outdoor motocross privateer in 2006. Vuillemin is a four-time winner of the King of Bercy supercross race held near Paris, France which, is considered the most prestigious supercross race outside the United States. In the almost 30-year history of the Bercy event, no one has won more times than Vuillemin.

=== Life after racing ===
After the 2009 season, Vuillemin spent time training and helping several riders and teams before accepting a job with Motoconcepts Racing as Team Manager.

== Results ==
2009 French National MX1 Champion

2008

2007 AMA Supercross Top Privateer 6th in AMA SX Series

2006 1st Place - Barcelona Supercross 1st Place - Fuente Alamo Supercross 6th Place - AMA Supercross 10th Place - AMA Motocross 2nd Place - Spring Creek MX Park 3 Top-Five finishes in the AMA Supercross and Outdoor Nationals 12 top-ten finishes

2005 Team Yamaha USA 4th Championship US SX 250 4th AMA MX Championship

2004 Team Yamaha USA 4th Championship US SX 250 4th Championship US MX 250

2003 Team Yamaha USA 7th Championship US SX 250 6th Championship US MX 250 2nd place a US Open Las Vegas King Of Paris Bercy Supercross

2002 Team Yamaha USA 2nd Place AMA SX 250

2001 Team Yamaha USA 8th Championship US SX 250 5th Championship US MX 250 King Of Supercross de Paris Bercy (250) Winner of the SX Stade de France in Paris, France Winner Motocross des Nations (with Seguy and Demaria)

2000 Team Yamaha USA Winner SX US 250 : 4 victories 4th MX US 250 : 2 victories at Sacramento (CA) and Mt. Morris (PA) 5th World SX Championship 250 King of Bercy 2000 Winner of the Stade de France in Paris, France

1999 Yamaha Motor France 3rd World MX Championship 250cc World SX Champion 250cc King of Bercy 1999 Winner du Stade de France

1998 Yamaha Motor France French National Champion SX 250 French Motocross Elite Champion 125 Vice-Champion USA 125cc West SX US 125cc Vice-Champion World MX Championship 125cc Vice-Champion World SX Championship 250cc Winner Stade de France

1997 Champion d'Europe SX 125 Champion France SX 125 4th 125cc USA SX West Coast Vice-Champion France Elite 125cc 6th World Championship 125cc Prince of Bercy 1997

1996 Champion d'Europe SX 125 Champion de France SX 125 6th France Elite Championship 16th World Championship 125cc Prince of Bercy 1996

1995

- Vice-Champion Europe SX 125
- Vice-Champion France SX 125
- 6th France Elite Championship 125
- 31st World Championship 125

1994

- 4th France Junior Championship
- 11th France Elite Championship 125
- 5th France SX Championship 125

1993 7th France 125 Juniors Championship 8th France SX championship 125

1992 12th France 125 Junior Championship

1991 Vice-Champion Minivert " 80 cadet " 3rd France 80 Cadet Championship

1990 Champion Minivert " 80 minime " 3rd France 80 Cadet Championship

1989 Champion Minivert " 80 Educatif " Champion de Provence 80cc

1988 Champion de Provence 60cc
