= AMA Supercross Championship =

American motorcycle racing series

Monster Energy AMA Supercross
- Category: Motorcycle racing
- Country: United States
- Inaugural season: 1974
- Classes: 450SX; 250SX East; 250SX West; 250SMX Next; KTM Junior
- Constructors: Beta; Ducati; Gas Gas; Honda; Husqvarna; Kawasaki; KTM; Suzuki; Triumph; Yamaha
- Riders' champion: 450cc: Ken Roczen (Suzuki); 250cc East: Cole Davies (Yamaha); 250cc West: Haiden Deegan (Yamaha)
- Teams' champion: HRC Honda
- Official website: www.supercrosslive.com

The AMA Supercross Championship (commercially known as Monster Energy AMA Supercross) is an American motorcycle racing series. Founded by the American Motorcyclist Association (AMA) in 1974, the AMA Supercross Championship races are held from January through early May. Supercross is a variant of motocross which involves off-road motorcycles on a constructed dirt track consisting of steep jumps and obstacles; the tracks are usually constructed inside a sports stadium. The easy accessibility and comfort of these stadium venues helped supercross surpass off-road motocross as a spectator attraction in the United States by the late 1970s.

From 2002 until 2021, the series was the World Championship of the sport. After not renewing its contract with the FIM, the series, along with the AMA Motocross Championship, formed the SuperMotocross World Championship from 2023.

== History ==
The first motocross race held on a race track inside a stadium took place on August 28, 1948, at Buffalo Stadium in the Paris suburb of Montrouge. As the popularity of motocross surged in the United States in the late 1960s, Bill France Sr. added a professional motocross race to the 1971 Daytona Beach Bike Week schedule. The 1972 race was held at Daytona International Speedway on a constructed track on the grass surface between the main grandstand and the pit lane. Jimmy Weinert won the 250 class and Mark Blackwell was the winner of the 500 class.

The event that paved the way for constructed, stadium-based motocross events was a 1972 race held in the Los Angeles Memorial Coliseum, promoted by Mike Goodwin and Terry Tiernan, then-president of the AMA, and won by 16-year-old Marty Tripes. It was billed as the "Super Bowl of Motocross" which led to the coining of the term "Supercross." The Super Bowl of Motocross II held the following year was an even greater success and, eventually evolved into the AMA Supercross championship held in stadiums across the United States and Canada.

Originally, each of the AMA Supercross races were promoted by different promoters, most notably Mike Goodwin in the West, Pace Motorsports in the Midwest and Southwest, Super Sports in the East, and Daytona International Speedway, which promotes its own race. In the 1980s, Mickey Thompson Entertainment Group (MTEG) took over the West region. In the 1990s, MTEG went bankrupt and Super Sports sold its business to Pace, which became the primary AMA Supercross promoter (with Daytona continuing to be the one holdout). In 1998, Pace was bought by SFX Entertainment, which was bought in turn by Clear Channel in 2000. The live events division of Clear Channel was split off as Live Nation in 2005, and the motorsports division was sold to Feld Entertainment in 2008, which currently promotes the championship except for the Daytona round, which is promoted by NASCAR Holdings (the owner of Daytona International Speedway).

While growing consistently since the '70s, the modern Supercross schedule since 1985 has become further compacted. The schedule would run from February to November, with both the "outdoor" (Motocross) and "indoor" (Supercross) schedules coinciding with each other during the year. By 1986, the schedule was compacted to a January to June schedule, and in 1998, the series adopted its present format, starting in early January and ending in early May, with races weekly except for Easter weekend (a traditional off-week for motorsport in the United States). In 2000, the present calendar was adopted with the season starting in the Los Angeles area on the Saturday after the first Thursday of January (between January 3–9) and ending with an early May race in Las Vegas, after which the AMA Motocross Championship "outdoor season" begins.

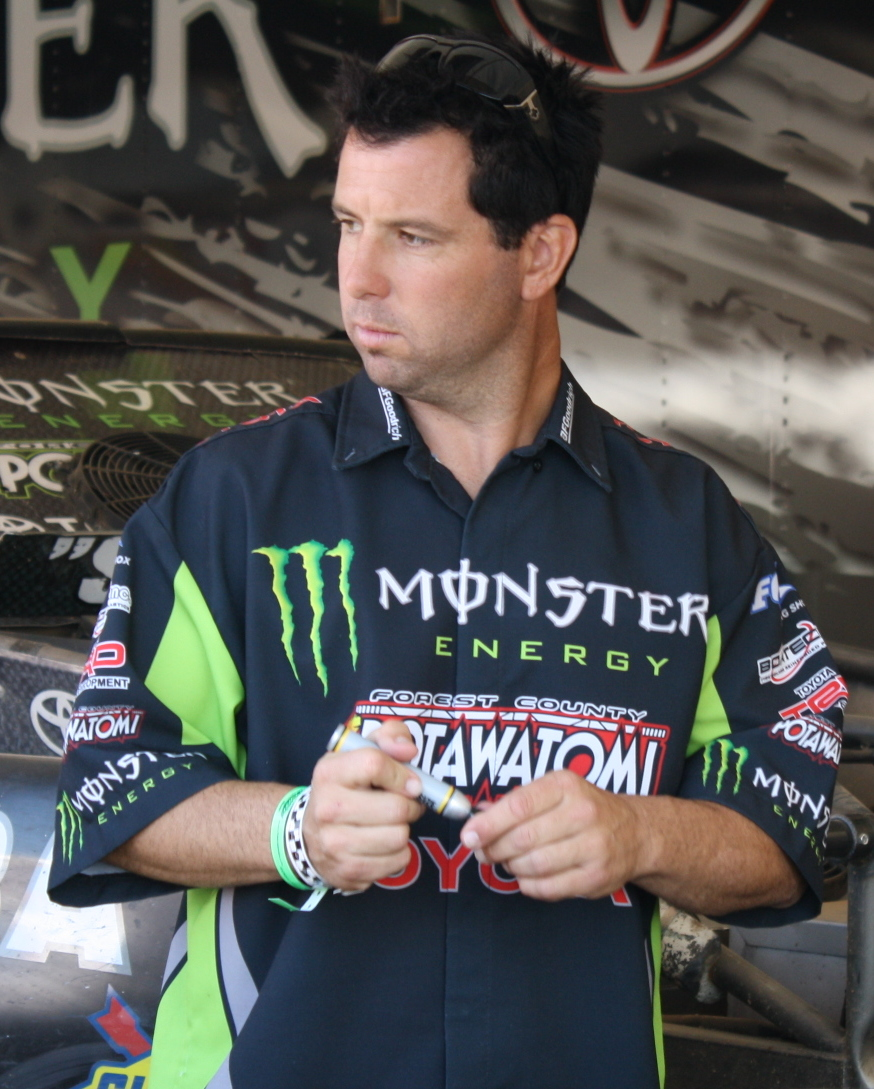
Jeremy McGrath won 7 Premier Class AMA Supercross titles, earning him the nickname the "King of Supercross"

The American Motorcyclist Association awards three Supercross Championships each year. They are the 450cc (was known as 250cc two-stroke), and both an East and West division on the 250cc (was 125cc two-stroke). Supercross racing classifications are governed by the displacement of the motorcycle's engine. They were based on two-stroke engines until 2006, when four-stroke engines replaced two-stroke engines. From 2007 until 2012, a formula nomenclature similar to IndyCar was used, with the 450cc class known as Supercross and 250cc as Supercross Lites. Starting in 2013, the AMA and Feld Motor Sports returned to the traditional nomenclature, based on four-stroke engines: 450cc (known as "MX1" in Europe), and 250cc (also known as "MX2"). The 450cc Champion has always been generally considered to be the most prestigious.

From 2011 to 2019, the final race of the season, known as the Monster Energy Cup for sponsorship reasons, was held at Sam Boyd Stadium in Las Vegas. A US $1 million purse is available to the rider who wins all three featured races. Ryan Villopoto won the purse at the inaugural event in 2011, as did Marvin Musquin in the 2017 edition, and Eli Tomac in the 2018 race.

== Calendar ==
The series begins in early January and continues until early-May. It consists of 17 rounds, held in football and baseball stadiums across the US.

Beginning with Anaheim 1, the series holds two of its first five races at Angel Stadium before it heads eastwards. The series concludes in Salt Lake City in early May. The 250 class is split into two divisions, each with its own separate championship. Starting in 2025, there are three East-West Shootouts, where the best riders from each 250 division race one another. The series also holds a race in Daytona during Daytona Bike Week.

== Event format ==
Each meet is structured similarly to Short track motor racing with two heat races and a consolation race in each class. In both classes, each heat race is six minutes plus one lap. Each heat features 20 riders (one may have 21 riders depending on qualifying results), with the top nine advancing to the feature. The other 22 riders are relegated to the consolation race, known as the Last Chance Qualifier, which is five minutes plus one lap, with the top four advancing to the final.

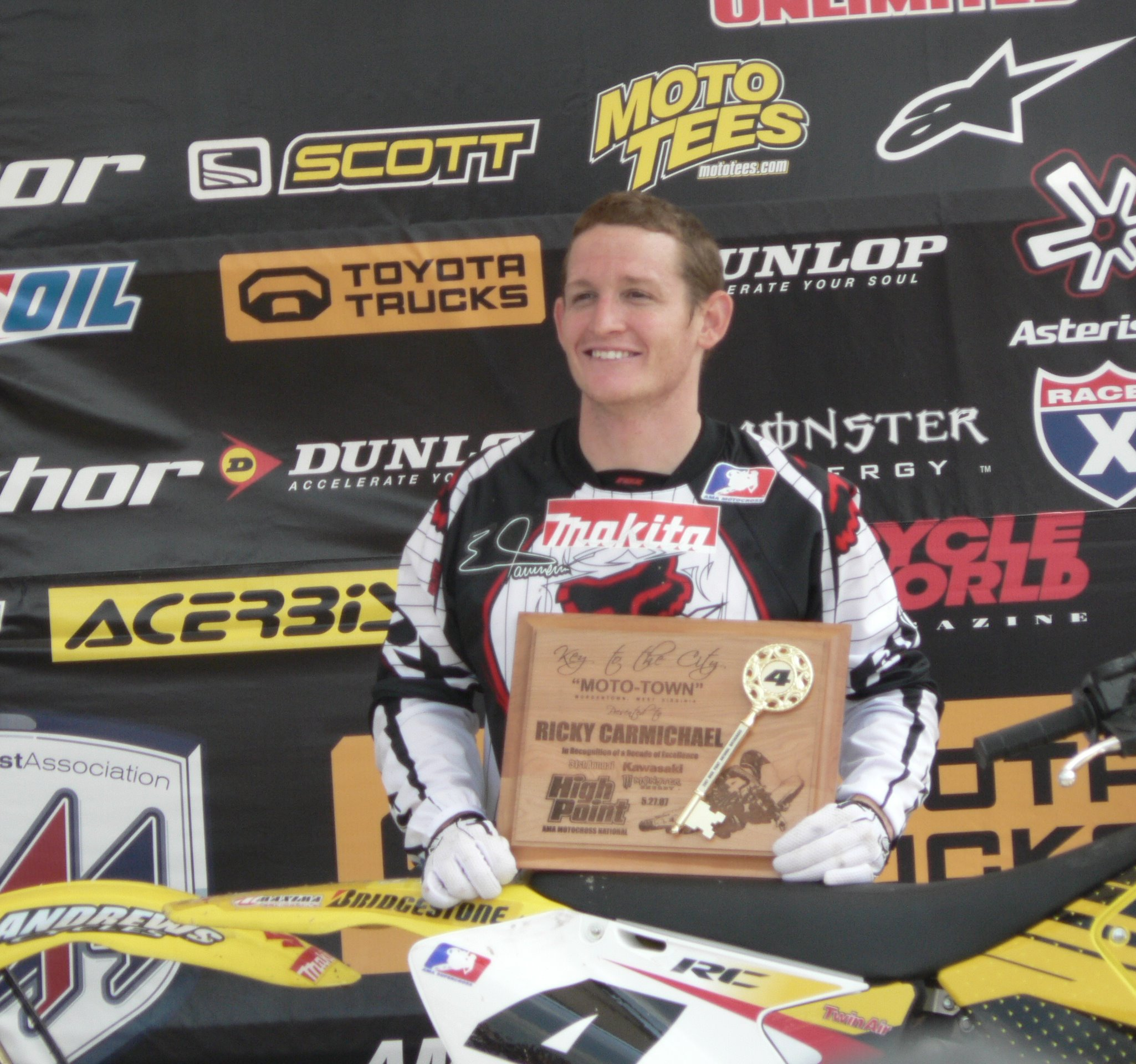
Ricky Carmichael dominated AMA Supercross throughout the mid-2000s, winning five titles

In the 450cc class, the highest placed competitor in points, provided he is in the top ten in national points, and has yet to qualify after either heat race or consolation race, will receive a provisional for the feature race. The feature race is 15 minutes plus one lap in the 250cc class, and 20 minutes plus one lap for the 450cc class, with 25 championship points for the race win. At 3 races per year a three race format is use. The rules are similar to the Monster Energy Cup individual scoring will determine the overall race winner.

For the season-ending East-West Showdown at Las Vegas for the 250cc class starting in May 2011, each region's top 20 will race in the non-championship event for a 15-minute heat race. Standard rules apply, with the feature race being 10 laps. In 2016, the East-West Showdown became a points-paying round where both regions' champions would be decided in the same feature. Starting in 2018, the combined East-West Showdown will also be held in the middle of the season, at the Indianapolis round.

Starting with the 2012 Season, riders who are in first place in the Series' Points Lead will use the red plate to race in the Series. Starting with the 2024 Season, the reigning champion from the SuperMotocross Championship in the 250cc & 450cc class, will use a purple plate with yellow numbers to signify their status as an SMX Champion.

If at any point during the Heat Races, LCQs or the Feature Races, that the race is red-flagged within less than 3 laps, the race will be a complete restart. However, if the race is red-flagged with more than 3 laps completed and the time has not expired and after a 10-minute delay, the race will be a staggered restart with riders lined up from the previous lap they went.

== Track ==
The sport of Supercross is best described as motocross racing that takes place within the confines of a sports stadium. The tracks are typically shorter in length than a standard motocross track. They feature a combination of man-made obstacles such as whoop sections (where riders skim along the tops of multiple bumps), rhythm sections (irregular series of jumps with a variety of combination options), and triple jumps (three jumps in a row that riders normally clear in a single leap of 70 feet or more). Many of the turns have banked berms, but some are flat. It takes roughly five hundred truckloads of dirt to make up a supercross track. Soil conditions can be hard-packed, soft, muddy, sandy, rutted, or any combination thereof.

== Television coverage ==
=== Current ===
In 2025, there are three broadcast partners from the NBC family of networks: NBC, USA Network and Peacock.

Network	Coverage
NBC	3 races live, season opener & 1 other round on delay
USA Network	Season opener & finale live
Peacock	Every race live

=== Previous ===
Period	Partners
2022-present	NBC, USA Network, CNBC, Peacock
2019-2021	NBC, NBCSN
2013-2018	Fox Sports
2000s-2012	Speed LIVE and CBS Sports select races next day on tape
1990s-2000s	ESPN

== AMA Supercross Championship winners by year ==
Between 2008 and 2021 the AMA Supercross Championship was also designated an FIM World Championship. Lost FIM World Championship status in 2022 due to a rebooted world championship.

Year	450cc Class (formerly 250 cc 2-stroke)	250cc West (formerly 125 cc 2-stroke West)	250cc East (formerly 125 cc 2-stroke East)
2026	(Germany) Ken Roczen (Suzuki)	(United States) Haiden Deegan (Yamaha)	(New Zealand) Cole Davies (Yamaha)
2025	(United States) Cooper Webb (Yamaha)	(United States) Haiden Deegan (Yamaha)	(France) Tom Vialle (KTM)
2024	(Australia) Jett Lawrence (Honda)	(United States) RJ Hampshire (Husqvarna)	(France) Tom Vialle (KTM)
2023	(United States) Chase Sexton (Honda)	(Australia) Jett Lawrence (Honda)	(Australia) Hunter Lawrence (Honda)
2022	(United States) Eli Tomac (Yamaha)	(United States) Christian Craig (Yamaha)	(Australia) Jett Lawrence (Honda)
2021	(United States) Cooper Webb (KTM)	(United States) Justin Cooper (Yamaha)	(United States) Colt Nichols (Yamaha)
2020	(United States) Eli Tomac (Kawasaki)	(France) Dylan Ferrandis (Yamaha)	(United States) Chase Sexton (Honda)
2019	(United States) Cooper Webb (KTM)	(France) Dylan Ferrandis (Yamaha)	(United States) Chase Sexton (Honda)
2018	(United States) Jason Anderson (Husqvarna)	(United States) Aaron Plessinger (Yamaha)	(United States) Zach Osborne (Husqvarna)
2017	(United States) Ryan Dungey (KTM)	(United States) Justin Hill (Kawasaki)	(United States) Zach Osborne (Husqvarna)
2016	(United States) Ryan Dungey (KTM)	(United States) Cooper Webb (Yamaha)	(United States) Malcolm Stewart (Honda)
2015	(United States) Ryan Dungey (KTM)	(United States) Cooper Webb (Yamaha)	(France) Marvin Musquin (KTM)
2014	(United States) Ryan Villopoto (Kawasaki)	(United States) Jason Anderson (KTM)	(United States) Justin Bogle (Honda)
2013	(United States) Ryan Villopoto (Kawasaki)	(Germany) Ken Roczen (KTM)	(United States) Wil Hahn (Honda)
2012	(United States) Ryan Villopoto (Kawasaki)	(United States) Eli Tomac (Honda)	(United States) Justin Barcia (Honda)
2011	(United States) Ryan Villopoto (Kawasaki)	(United States) Broc Tickle (Kawasaki)	(United States) Justin Barcia (Honda)
2010	(United States) Ryan Dungey (Suzuki)	(United States) Jake Weimer (Kawasaki)	(France) Christophe Pourcel (Kawasaki)
2009	(United States) James Stewart Jr. (Yamaha)	(United States) Ryan Dungey (Suzuki)	(France) Christophe Pourcel (Kawasaki)
2008	(Australia) Chad Reed (Yamaha)	(United States) Jason Lawrence (Yamaha)	(United States) Trey Canard (Honda)
2007	(United States) James Stewart Jr. (Kawasaki)	(United States) Ryan Villopoto (Kawasaki)	(New Zealand) Ben Townley (Kawasaki)
2006	(United States) Ricky Carmichael (Suzuki)	(South Africa) Grant Langston (Kawasaki)	(United States) Davi Millsaps (Honda)
2005	(United States) Ricky Carmichael (Suzuki)	(United States) Ivan Tedesco (Kawasaki)	(South Africa) Grant Langston (Kawasaki)
2004	(Australia) Chad Reed (Yamaha)	(United States) Ivan Tedesco (Kawasaki)	(United States) James Stewart Jr. (Kawasaki)
2003	(United States) Ricky Carmichael (Honda)	(United States) James Stewart Jr. (Kawasaki)	(United States) Branden Jesseman (Suzuki)
2002	(United States) Ricky Carmichael (Honda)	(United States) Travis Preston (Honda)	(Australia) Chad Reed (Yamaha)
2001	(United States) Ricky Carmichael (Kawasaki)	(Costa Rica) Ernesto Fonseca (Yamaha)	(United States) Travis Pastrana (Suzuki)
2000	(United States) Jeremy McGrath (Yamaha)	(United States) Shae Bentley (Kawasaki)	(France) Stéphane Roncada (Yamaha)
1999	(United States) Jeremy McGrath (Yamaha)	(United States) Nathan Ramsey (Kawasaki)	(Costa Rica) Ernesto Fonseca (Yamaha)
1998	(United States) Jeremy McGrath (Yamaha)	(United States) John Dowd (Yamaha)	(United States) Ricky Carmichael (Kawasaki)
1997	(United States) Jeff Emig (Kawasaki)	(United States) Kevin Windham (Yamaha)	(United States) Tim Ferry (Suzuki)
1996	(United States) Jeremy McGrath (Honda)	(United States) Kevin Windham (Yamaha)	(France) Mickaël Pichon (Kawasaki)
1995	(United States) Jeremy McGrath (Honda)	(United States) Damon Huffman (Suzuki)	(France) Mickaël Pichon (Kawasaki)
1994	(United States) Jeremy McGrath (Honda)	(United States) Damon Huffman (Suzuki)	(United States) Ezra Lusk (Suzuki)
1993	(United States) Jeremy McGrath (Honda)	(United States) Jimmy Gaddis (Kawasaki)	(United States) Doug Henry (Honda)
1992	(United States) Jeff Stanton (Honda)	(United States) Jeremy McGrath (Honda)	(United States) Brian Swink (Suzuki)
1991	(France) Jean-Michel Bayle (Honda)	(United States) Jeremy McGrath (Honda)	(United States) Brian Swink (Honda)
1990	(United States) Jeff Stanton (Honda)	(United States) Ty Davis (Honda)	(United States) Denny Stephenson (Suzuki)
1989	(United States) Jeff Stanton (Honda)	(United States) Jeff Matiasevich (Kawasaki)	(United States) Damon Bradshaw (Yamaha)
1988	(United States) Rick Johnson (Honda)	(United States) Jeff Matiasevich (Kawasaki)	(United States) Todd DeHoop (Suzuki)
1987	(United States) Jeff Ward (Kawasaki)	(United States) Willie Surratt (Suzuki)	(United States) Ron Tichenor (Suzuki)
1986	(United States) Rick Johnson (Honda)	(United States) Donny Schmit (Kawasaki)	(United States) Keith Turpin (Suzuki)
1985	(United States) Jeff Ward (Kawasaki)	(United States) Bobby Moore (Suzuki)	(United States) Eddie Warren (Kawasaki)
1984	(United States) Johnny O'Mara (Honda)	N/A	
1983	(United States) David Bailey (Honda)	N/A	
1982	(United States) Donnie Hansen (Honda)	N/A	
1981	(United States) Mark Barnett (Suzuki)	N/A	
1980	(United States) Mike Bell (Yamaha)	N/A	
1979	(United States) Bob Hannah (Yamaha)	N/A	
1978	(United States) Bob Hannah (Yamaha)	N/A	
1977	(United States) Bob Hannah (Yamaha)	N/A	
1976	(United States) Jimmy Weinert (Kawasaki)	500cc Class	
1975	(United States) Jimmy Ellis (Can Am)	(United States) Steve Stackable (Maico)	
1974	(Netherlands) Pierre Karsmakers (Yamaha)	(United States) Gary Semics (Suzuki)	

== List of wins by manufacturer ==
450cc Class (formerly 250 cc 2-stroke)	250cc West (formerly 125 cc 2-stroke West)	250cc East (formerly 125 cc 2-stroke East)
(Japan) Honda (17)	(Japan) Kawasaki (14)	(Japan) Honda (11)
(Japan) Yamaha (13)	(Japan) Yamaha (14)	(Japan) Kawasaki (9)
(Japan) Kawasaki (11)	(Japan) Honda (6)	(Japan) Suzuki (9)
(Austria) KTM (5)	(Japan) Suzuki (4)	(Japan) Yamaha (8)
(Japan) Suzuki (5)	(Austria) KTM (2)	(Austria) KTM (3)
(Austria) Husqvarna (1)	(Austria) Husqvarna (1)	(Austria) Husqvarna (2)

== Statistics ==
=== Supercross all-time wins list ===
Riders in bold have competed in the 2026 Supercross championship

† next to rider's name in the 250/125 Class column indicates rider has competed in the 2026 450 Supercross championship

450/250 Class	Wins	250/125 Class	Wins
(United States) Jeremy McGrath	72	(United States) James Stewart Jr.	18
(United States) **Eli Tomac**	57	(United States) Nathan Ramsey	15
(United States) James Stewart Jr.	50	(United States) **Haiden Deegan**	14
(United States) Ricky Carmichael	48	**(United States)** Jeremy McGrath	13
(Australia) Chad Reed	44	(Australia) Jett Lawrence	13
(United States) Ryan Villopoto	41	(United States) Austin Forkner †	13
(United States) Ryan Dungey	34	(United States) Eli Tomac †	12
(United States) **Cooper Webb**	31	(United States) Ryan Dungey	12
(Germany) **Ken Roczen**	28	(United States) Ricky Carmichael	12
(United States) Ricky Johnson	28	(United States) Kevin Windham	12
(United States) Bob Hannah	27	(France) Christophe Pourcel	12
(United States) Jeff Ward	20	(United States) Brian Swink	12
(United States) Damon Bradshaw	19	**(Costa Rica)** Ernesto Fonseca	12
(United States) Kevin Windham	18	(Australia) Hunter Lawrence †	12
**(United States) Chase Sexton**	18	**(United States)** Damon Huffman	12
(United States) Mark Barnett	17	(United States) Cooper Webb †	11
**(United States)** Jeff Stanton	17	(United States) Justin Barcia †	11
**(France)** Jean-Michel Bayle	16	**(United States)** Ryan Villopoto	11
**(United States) Jason Anderson**	14	(United States) Adam Cianciarulo	11
(United States) Ezra Lusk	12	**(France)** Marvin Musquin	11
**(United States)** David Bailey	12	**(United States)** Jeff Matiasevich	11
**(United States)** Mike Bell	11	**(France)** Mickaël Pichon	10
(United States) Mike LaRocco	10	**(United States)** Ivan Tedesco	10
(France) Marvin Musquin	10	(United States) Shane McElrath †	9
(United States) Broc Glover	10	**(United States)** Jake Weimer	9
**(Australia)** Jett Lawrence	9	(United States) Keith Turpin	8
(United States) Jimmy Ellis	8	(Scotland) Dean Wilson	8
(United States) Johnny O'Mara	7	(United States) Travis Pastrana	8
(France) David Vuillemin	7	**(United States)** Denny Stephenson	8
**(United States)** Jeff Emig	7	(United States) Justin Hill †	8
(United States) **Justin Barcia**	6	**(New Zealand) Cole Davies**	8
(United States) Trey Canard	5	(United States) Davi Millsaps	7
(United States) Davi Millsaps	5	(South Africa) Grant Langston	7
(United States) Mike Kiedrowski	5	(France) Stéphane Roncada	7
(United States) Kent Howerton	5	(United States) Christian Craig †	7
(Australia) **Hunter Lawrence**	5	(United States) John Dowd	7
(United States) Darrell Schultz	4	(United States) Ezra Lusk	7
(United States) Jimmy Weinert	4	**(United States)** Doug Henry	7
(United States) Donnie Hansen	4	(United States) Trey Canard	7
(United States) Doug Henry	4	(United States) **Nate Thrasher**	7
(United States) Larry Ward	3	**(United States)** Josh Hansen	7
(United States) Marty Smith	3	(France) Dylan Ferrandis †	6
(United States) Marty Tripes	2	(United States) Chase Sexton †	6
(United States) **Aaron Plessinger**	2	(Germany) Ken Roczen †	6
(United States) Tony DiStefano	2	(United States) Jeremy Martin	6
(United States) Nathan Ramsey	1	(Australia) Chad Reed	6
(United States) John Dowd	1	(United States) Zach Osborne	6
(France) Sébastien Tortelli	1	(United States) R.J. Hampshire †	6
(Netherlands) Pierre Karsmakers	1	(United States) Damon Bradshaw	6
(United States) Damon Huffman	1	**(United States)** Aaron Plessinger †	6
(South Africa) Greg Albertyn	1	**(United States)** Jeff Emig	6
(United States) Michael Craig	1	(United States) Andrew Short	5
(United States) Doug Dubach	1	(United States) Cole Seely	5
(United States) Jeff Matiasevich	1	(United States) Braden Jesseman	5
(United States) Rex Staten	1	(Ecuador) Martin Davalos	5
(United States) Chuck Sun	1	(United States) Jordon Smith	5
(United States) Steve Wise	1	(United States) **Levi Kitchen**	5
(United States) Gaylon Mosier	1	(United States) Jason Anderson †	5
(Czechoslovakia) Jaroslav Falta	1	**(United States)** Joey Savatgy †	5
(United States) Jim Pomeroy	1	(United States) Colt Nichols †	4
(United States) Rick Ryan	1	(United States) Justin Cooper †	4
(United States) Justin Brayton	1	(United States) Donny Schmit	4
(United States) Blake Baggett	1	(United States) Rich Tichenor	4
(United States) Cole Seely	1	(United States) Jimmy Button	4
(United States) Zach Osborne	1	(United States) Blake Baggett	4
**(United States)** Andrew Short	1	(United States) Michael Brown	4
(United States) Josh Grant	1	(United States) Brock Sellards	4
(United States) **Malcolm Stewart**	1	(United States) Travis Preston	4
(United States) Josh Hill	1	(France) David Vuillemin	4
		**(United Kingdom) Max Anstie**	4
		(United States) **Seth Hammaker**	4
		(United States) David Pingree	4
		(United States) Kyle Lewis	3
		(United States) Mike LaRocco	3
		(United States) Buddy Antunez	3
		(United States) Tallon Vohland	3
		(United States) Jeremy Buehl	3
		(United States) Ryan Hughes	3
		(United States) Austin Stroupe	3
		(United States) Ryan Sipes	3
		(United States) Blake Wharton	3
		(United States) Justin Bogle	3
		(United States) Malcolm Stewart †	3
		(New Zealand) Ben Townley	3
		(United States) Willie Surratt	3
		(United States) **Cameron McAdoo**	3
		**(United States)** Josh Grant	3
		(United States) Jason Lawrence	3
		(Japan) **Jo Shimoda**	3
		**(United States)** Ty Davis	3
		(United States) Todd DeHoop	3
		(France) Tom Vialle	3
		**(United States)** Eddie Warren	3
		(United States) Tim Ferry	2
		(United States) Greg Schnell	2
		(United States) Wil Hahn	2
		**(United States)** Casey Johnson	2
		(United States) Mike Healey	2
		(United States) Brock Tickle	2
		(United States) Shae Bentley	2
		**(United States)** Mike Kiedrowski	2
		(United States) Chad Pederson	1
		(Mexico) Pedro Gonzalez	1
		(United States) Jeff Willoh	1
		(United States) Michael Craig	1
		(United States) Casey Lytle	1
		(United States) Michael Brandes	1
		(United States) Justin Buckelew	1
		(United States) Matt Walker	1
		(United States) Broc Hepler	1
		(United States) Billy Laninovich	1
		(United States) Tyler Bowers	1
		(United States) Jessy Nelson	1
		(United States) Tyson Vohland	1
		**(United States) Michael Mosiman**	1
		(United States) Jimmy Gaddis	1
		(United States) Bobby Moore	1
		**(United States)** Brian Deegan	1
		**(United States)** Garrett Marchbanks †	1
		**(United States)** Badder Manneh	1
		(United States) Todd Campbell	1
		**(United States) Julian Beaumer**	1
		**(United States)** Phil Lawrence	1
		**(United States) Chance Hymas**	1
		**(United States)** **Pierce Brown**	1

== Venues ==
=== Current venues ===
Venue	City	State/Province	Period	Type
Daytona International Speedway	Daytona Beach	Florida	1971–present	Racetrack
Angel Stadium	Anaheim	California	1976–1979, 1981–1987, 1989–1996, 1999–2020, 2022–present	Baseball
Raymond James Stadium	Tampa	Florida	1999, 2018, 2020, 2023, 2025, 2027-present	Football
Rice–Eccles Stadium	Salt Lake City	Utah	2001–2004, 2009–2013, 2017–2018, 2020–present	Football
Lumen Field	Seattle	Washington	2005–2014, 2017–2019, 2022–present	Football
Ford Field	Detroit	Michigan	2006–2008, 2014–2017, 2019, 2022–present	Football
Lucas Oil Stadium	Indianapolis	Indiana	2009–2019, 2021–present	Football
AT&T Stadium	Arlington	Texas	2010–present	Football
MetLife Stadium	East Rutherford	New Jersey	2014–2017, 2019, 2023, 2025, 2027-present	Football
Gillette Stadium	Foxborough	Massachusetts	2016, 2018, 2022, 2024-2025, 2027-present	Football
State Farm Stadium	Glendale	Arizona	2016–2020, 2022–present	Football
Empower Field at Mile High	Denver	Colorado	2019, 2022–present	Football
Snapdragon Stadium	San Diego	California	2023–present	Football
Acrisure Stadium	Pittsburgh	Pennsylvania	2025, 2027-present	Football
Alamodome	San Antonio	Texas	2027-present	Football
M&T Bank Stadium	Baltimore	Maryland	2027-present	Football

=== Former venues ===
Venue	City	State/Province	Period	Type
The Dome at America's Center	St. Louis	Missouri	1996–2018, 2020, 2022, 2024, 2026	Football
Reliant Stadium	Houston	Texas	2003–2015, 2018–2019, 2021, 2023, 2026	Football
Nissan Stadium	Nashville	Tennessee	2019, 2023–2024, 2026	Football
Protective Stadium	Birmingham	Alabama	2024–2026	Football
Lincoln Financial Field	Philadelphia	Pennsylvania	2024–2026	Football
Huntington Bank Field	Cleveland	Ohio	2026	Football
Oracle Park	San Francisco	California	2003–2010, 2024	Baseball
Atlanta Motor Speedway	Hampton	Georgia	2021–2023	Racetrack
Oakland Coliseum	Oakland	California	1979–1980, 1984, 2011–2020, 2022-2023	Baseball
U.S. Bank Stadium	Minneapolis	Minnesota	2017–2019, 2022	Football
Petco Park	San Diego	California	2015–2020, 2022	Baseball
Camping World Stadium	Orlando	Florida	1983–1985, 1991–1997, 2005–2007, 2021	Football
Mercedes-Benz Stadium	Atlanta	Georgia	2018–2020	Football
Sam Boyd Stadium	Las Vegas	Nevada	1990–1995, 1997–2019	Football
Georgia Dome	Atlanta	Georgia	1993–2017	Football
Rogers Centre	Toronto	Ontario	2008–2014, 2016–2017	Baseball / football
Levi's Stadium	Santa Clara	California	2015–2016	Football
Chase Field	Phoenix	Arizona	1999–2015	Baseball
Qualcomm Stadium	San Diego	California	1980–1982, 1985–1987, 1989–1996, 1998–2014	Baseball / football
Hubert H. Humphrey Metrodome	Minneapolis	Minnesota	1994–2004, 2008, 2013	Baseball / football
Mercedes-Benz Superdome	New Orleans	Louisiana	1977–1980, 1998–2002, 2009, 2012	Football
Dodger Stadium	Los Angeles	California	2011–2012	Baseball
Jacksonville Municipal Stadium	Jacksonville	Florida	2009–2011	Football
Texas Stadium	Irving	Texas	1975–1977, 1985–1989, 1991–2008	Football
RCA Dome	Indianapolis	Indiana	1992–2008	Football
Pontiac Silverdome	Pontiac	Michigan	1976–1984, 1986–2005	Football
Astrodome	Houston	Texas	1974–2002	Baseball / football
Route 66 Raceway	Joliet	Illinois	2000	Racetrack
Kingdome	Seattle	Washington	1978–1999	Baseball / football
Los Angeles Memorial Coliseum	Los Angeles	California	1972–1979, 1981–1982, 1984–1992, 1997–1998	Football
Sun Devil Stadium	Phoenix	Arizona	1986–1987, 1991, 1997–1998	Football
Tampa Stadium	Tampa	Florida	1987–1990, 1992–1994, 1996, 1998	Football
Charlotte Motor Speedway	Charlotte	North Carolina	1996–1998	Racetrack
Mile High Stadium	Denver	Colorado	1996	Football
American Legion Memorial Stadium	Charlotte	North Carolina	1990–1995	Football
Spartan Stadium	San Jose	California	1990–1995	Football
Cleveland Stadium	Cleveland	Ohio	1995	Baseball / football
Rose Bowl	Pasadena	California	1983–1985, 1990, 1993	Football
Atlanta–Fulton County Stadium	Atlanta	Georgia	1977–1986, 1989–1992	Baseball / football
Giants Stadium	East Rutherford	New Jersey	1987–1991	Football
State Fair Speedway	Oklahoma City	Oklahoma	1989–1991	Racetrack
Tropicana Field	St. Petersburg	Florida	1991	Baseball / Football
Cotton Bowl	Dallas	Texas	1983–1984, 1990	Football
Foxboro Stadium	Foxborough	Massachusetts	1983–1984, 1990	Football
Joe Robbie Stadium	Miami	Florida	1989	Football
Miami Orange Bowl	Miami	Florida	1987	Football
Talladega Superspeedway	Talladega	Alabama	1984	Racetrack
Rich Stadium	Orchard Park	New York	1984	Football
Cal Expo	Sacramento	California	1984	Racetrack
Three Rivers Stadium	Pittsburgh	Pennsylvania	1978, 1983	Baseball / football
Arrowhead Stadium	Kansas City	Missouri	1980–1983	Football
Robert F. Kennedy Memorial Stadium	Washington, D.C.		1983	Baseball / football
John F. Kennedy Stadium	Philadelphia	Pennsylvania	1980	Football

== World Supercross Championship winners by year ==
Conceived in 2003; merged with the AMA series prior to the 2008 season until 2021.

Year	450 Class
2022	Eli Tomac
2021	Cooper Webb
2020	Eli Tomac
2019	Cooper Webb
2018	Jason Anderson
2017	Ryan Dungey
2016	Ryan Dungey
2015	Ryan Dungey
2014	Ryan Villopoto
2013	Ryan Villopoto
2012	Ryan Villopoto
2011	Ryan Villopoto
2010	Ryan Dungey
2009	James Stewart Jr.
2008	Chad Reed
2007	James Stewart Jr.
2006	James Stewart Jr.
2005	Ricky Carmichael
2004	Heath Voss
2003	Chad Reed

== See also ==
- List of Grand Prix motocross world champions
- List of AMA motocross national champions
- List of Trans-AMA motocross champions
- Outline of motorcycles and motorcycling
