= John Dowd (motorcyclist) =

American motorcycle racer

- Nationality: American
- Born: August 10, 1965 (age 61) Chicopee, Massachusetts, U.S.

Motocross career
- Years active: 1987 - 2013
- Teams: Suzuki, Honda, Kawasaki, Yamaha, KTM

John Dowd (born August 10, 1965), also known as "the Junk Yard Dog", is an American former professional motocross racer. He competed in the AMA Supercross and Motocross Championships from 1987 to 2013.

== Motocross racing career ==
Originally from Chicopee, Massachusetts, Dowd entered his first motocross (MX) race at age 20, considered old for prospective professional motocross riders. Dowd progressed quickly in the sport and was soon beating riders with many years more experience of motocross than himself and was able to turn professional by age 21.

With his relatively late start, Dowd has achieved the best results of his career later in life, which is unusual compared to his typical competitors. He holds many AMA records, including being the oldest rider to win an AMA National (Southwick 125cc, 1998), oldest rider to win a Supercross championship (125cc West, 1998), oldest rider to win a National moto (Mt. Morris, 2000), and oldest rider to finish on the podium in an AMA National (Southwick 250cc, 2005).

Dowd has been a podium contender in AMA Motocross and Supercross competition for almost 20 years. His greatest strengths were his stamina and endurance, enabling him to ride hard for the entire moto. He is considered a specialist on sand tracks. Dowd is from the New England area, renowned for its strength-sapping, sandy tracks. He finished on the podium in third place at the 2005 Southwick 250cc National just shy of his 40th birthday, aboard a privateer Suzuki RMZ450. On August 30, 2009, at the Lucas Oil AMA Pro Motocross Southwick National at Motocross 338, John Dowd, at the age of 44, rode his Kawasaki KX450 on his home track, finishing second in the 450 class Moto-2 and took 3rd overall. He also won the 2006 Endurocross championship.
