= Jeff Emig =

American motorcycle racer

- Nationality: American
- Born: December 1, 1970 (age 55) Kansas City, Kansas

Motocross career
- Years active: 1988 - 1999
- Teams: Kawasaki, Yamaha
- Championships: AMA 125cc - 1992 AMA 250cc - 1996, 1997 FIM World Supercross - 1996 AMA 250cc Supercross - 1997
- Wins: 37

Cam Jeffrey Emig (born December 1, 1970) is an American former professional motocross racer. He competed in the AMA Motocross Championships from 1988 to 1999. He was one of the top American motocross racers of the 1990s. During his motorcycle racing career, Emig won four AMA Motocross Championships, an FIM World Supercross title and was a six-time member of the U.S. Motocross des Nations team. He was inducted to the AMA Motorcycle Hall of Fame in 2004.

== Motorcycle racing career ==
Emig was born in Kansas City, Kansas where he began trail riding on motorcycles with his family. He followed his older brother in taking up the sport of motocross. He was successful as an amateur racer winning four titles at the AMA Amateur Motocross Nationals at the Loretta Lynn Ranch in Tennessee. In 1990, Emig joined the Kawasaki factory racing team earning a fifth-place finish in the 1990 125cc national championship. His impressive results earned him a contract to ride for the Yamaha factory racing team in 1991. 1991 was also the year in which he began his career long rivalry with Jeremy McGrath. In 1992, Emig won his first AMA national race in the 125 class in Buchanan, Michigan then, went on to win six of the seven nationals to earn his first AMA National Championship.

In 1996, Emig returned to the Kawasaki team and had one of his best seasons in 1997. In the 13 round series he won seven races, finished second five times, and had one fifth-place finish. He won 17 of the 26 motos that year claiming the 250cc motocross national championship as well as the 250cc supercross championship. In 1999, Emig was arrested for marijuana possession. Emig pled guilty to possession of drug paraphernalia, and the charges for marijuana possession were dropped however, he lost his job with the Kawasaki racing team. Emig gained respect from his peers for taking full responsibility for his actions and blaming only himself. He would return as a privateer with a few sponsors and riding a Yamaha YZ250. He had his last major victory just a few weeks after being dropped by Kawasaki; winning the US Open of Supercross in Las Vegas.

On December 30, 1999, at the track of fellow Yamaha rider and neighbor Stephane Roncada in Riverside County, California, Emig came up short on a triple jump, reportedly snapping both forearms above the wrist. The end of Emig's career came on May 4, 2000, when he was preparing for the National Motocross Championship later that year. Emig suffered another horrific crash where he crushed a vertebra in his back and compound fractured his right lower leg, forcing him into retirement.

Emig's starting prowess was legendary. His clutch control and first corner fearlessness saw him lead many races into the first turn in the 1990s. He was notoriously hard to pass, and always rode with his elbows high up in an outward position. During his 11-year professional career, Emig earned 37 AMA national wins. He is still involved in motocross on several levels, including television color commentary on Speed and CBS. Emig was inducted into the AMA Motorcycle Hall of Fame in 2004.

Emig's involvement with the world of motocross continues. Midway through 2016, it was announced that Emig would become a Husqvarna ambassador and spokesman. Quote: Husqvarna Motorcycles strongly believes in the importance of this foundation and Emig's involvement will only bring forward momentum to this industry-wide initiative. Current advisor and acting president of the USMCA, Mark Blackwell, also sees the connection between Emig and association critical to success.

Lately, Emig has announced for AMA Supercross. For 2019, Emig is currently TV color commentating/broadcasting the "World MotoCross GP".

== AMA Supercross/Motocross Results ==
Year	Rnd 1	Rnd 2	Rnd 3	Rnd 4	Rnd 5	Rnd 6	Rnd 7	Rnd 8	Rnd 9	Rnd 10	Rnd 11	Rnd 12	Rnd 13	Rnd 14	Rnd 15	Rnd 16	Rnd 17	Rnd 18	Average Finish	Podium Percent	Place
*1991 125 SX-W	-	OUT	20	3	4	-	-	1	-	-	-	-	2	6	-	1	1	1	4.33	67%	2nd
1991 125 MX	16	15	4	6	3	3	13	4	14	3	2	2	8	-	-	-	-	-	7.15	38%	3rd
1992 125 MX	6	7	11	2	1	1	1	5	1	1	1	-	-	-	-	-	-	-	3.36	64%	1st
1993 125 MX	9	4	1	3	1	3	1	4	1	1	5	2	-	-	-	-	-	-	2.91	67%	2nd
1995 250 SX	9	5	3	7	7	3	4	8	2	15	4	10	2	3	1	-	-	-	5.53	40%	3rd
1995 250 MX	4	2	5	4	1	2	3	4	11	2	3	3	-	-	-	-	-	-	3.67	58%	2nd
1996 250 SX	9	7	11	6	2	2	5	8	5	OUT	6	2	4	1	3	-	-	-	5.07	36%	2nd
1996 250 MX	2	2	2	1	2	2	1	3	2	1	2	2	1	-	-	-	-	-	1.76	100%	1st
1997 250 SX	6	14	1	4	1	2	1	5	1	3	2	7	4	1	5	-	-	-	3.80	53%	1st
1997 250 MX	1	2	1	5	2	2	2	1	1	1	1	2	1	-	-	-	-	-	1.69	92%	1st

== Major titles ==
- Multi-time Amateur National Motocross Champion
- 1992 125 AMA National Motocross Champion (Yamaha)
- 1996 250 AMA National Motocross Champion (Kawasaki)
- 1997 250 AMA Supercross Champion (Kawasaki)
- 1997 250 AMA National Motocross Champion (Kawasaki)
- 1997 King of Bercy (Kawasaki)
- 1999 US OPEN champion (Yamaha)
- 1992-1997 member of the mx of nations for team USA

== Total Career AMA Wins ==
- 13 Wins in 125/250 AMA Motocross 6-1992 5-1993 2-1994
- 7 Wins in 250/450 AMA Supercross 1-1995 1-1996 5-1997
- 16 Wins in 250/450 AMA Motocross 1-1995 4-1996 7-1997 4-1998
- 36 Total AMA Wins 6-1992 5-1993 2-1994 2-1995 5-1996 12-1997 4-1998
- Has won his class in the Motocross of Nations on every displacement 125,250 and 500
