= Kevin Windham =

American motorcycle racer (born 1978)

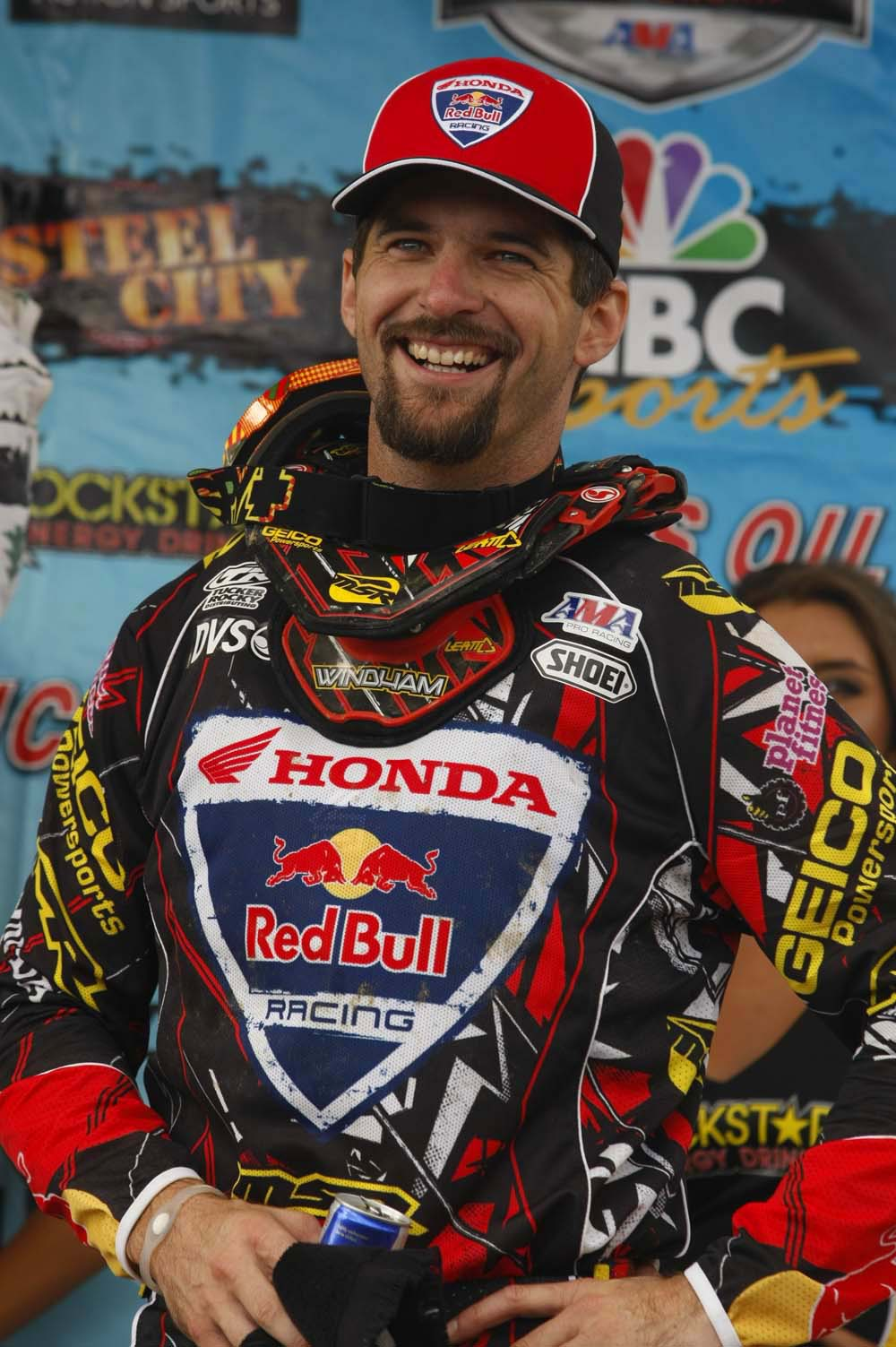
- Kevin Windham, 2010
- Nationality: American
- Born: February 28, 1978 (age 48); Baton Rouge, Louisiana
- Current team: Geico Powersports Honda
- Bike number: 14

Kevin Windham (born February 28, 1978), is an American former professional motocross racer. At 17 he received a factory ride from Team Yamaha. Often referred to by the nickname "K-Dub", he achieved back to back AMA 125 West Supercross Championships in 1996 and 1997, the 2005 Motocross des Nations team championship, and was second in points for the 2008 supercross season. In 1999, Windham won the United States Grand Prix of Motocross held at Budd's Creek, Maryland. Windham has been described as "arguably the best rider to have never won a National Championship".

Regarded as one of the most naturally talented riders competing in motocross and supercross, Windham has finished second in the overall points standings five times, without once winning. Though one of the oldest riders on the track in 2011, his acknowledged class, grace, and riding ability made him a favourite with the fans. He announced his retirement from racing at the third round of the 2013 Supercross season.

== Career ==
=== Amateur racing ===
The 1994 AMA Amateur and Youth National Motocross Championships, at Loretta Lynn’s Dude Ranch, was the venue for Windham’s final races as an amateur. He won both the 125cc A Modified and the 250cc Open A Modified classes, setting a new lap record, taking out his seventh and eighth amateur national titles, and extending his personal winning streak at Loretta Lynn’s to eighteen consecutive motos.

=== Professional racing ===
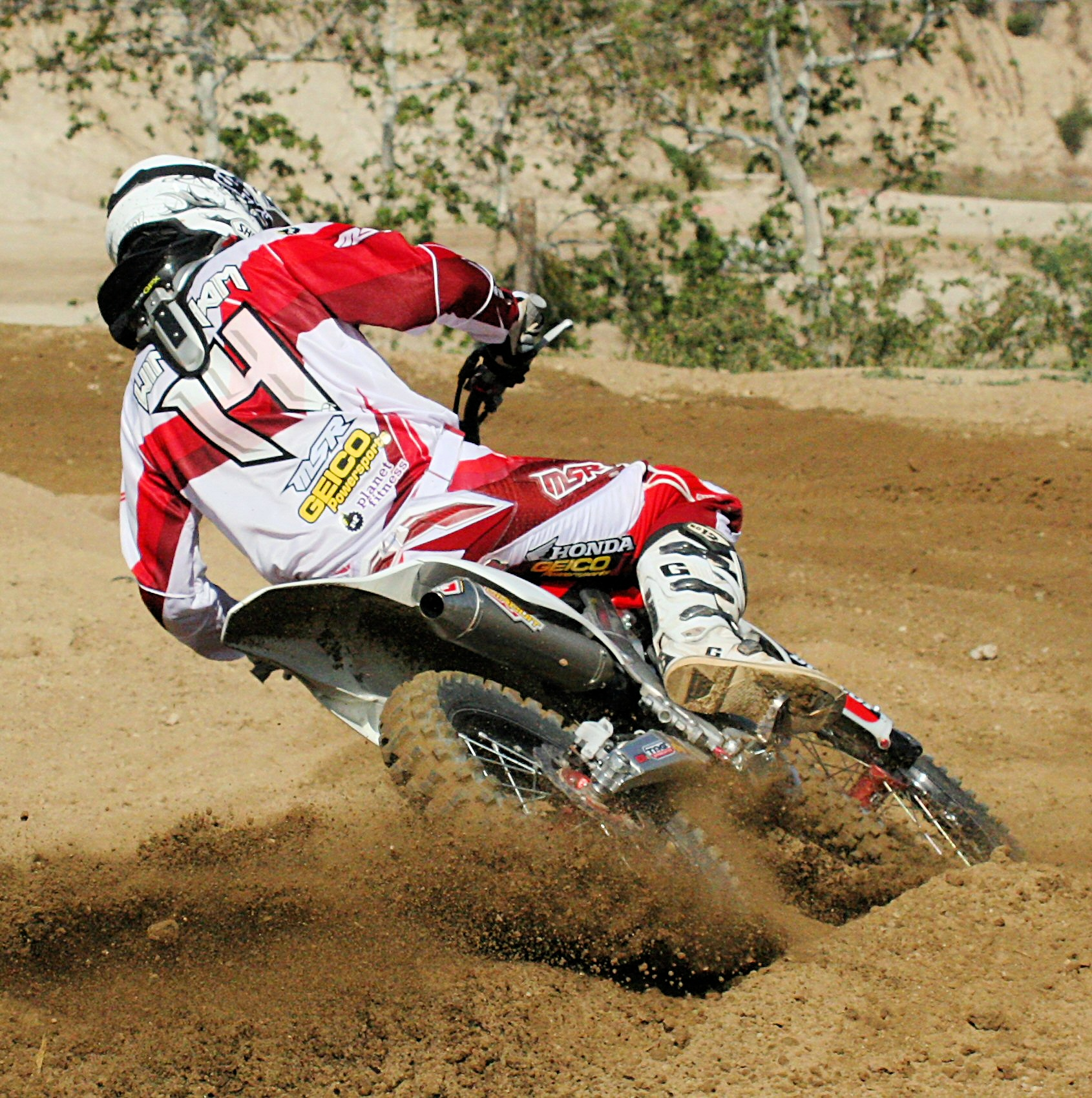
Windham riding for Geico Powersports Honda

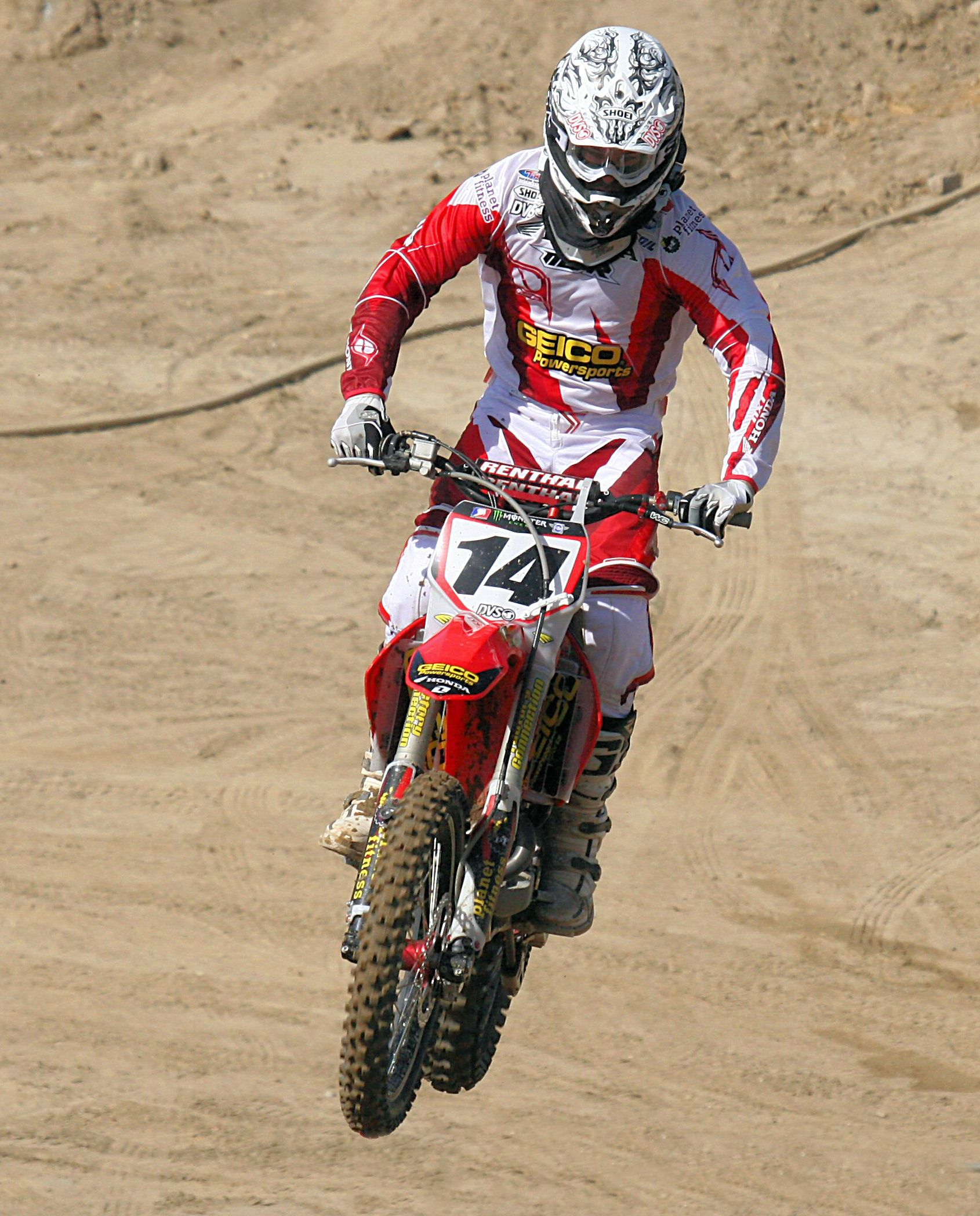
At Glen Helen Raceway, in San Bernardino, California, in 2009

In 1994, Windham turned professional midway through the season, riding a Kawasaki. He was awarded the AMA "Rookie of the Year" award, and after an impressive performance at Mt. Morris, PA, where he nearly beat Doug Henry for the moto win and was signed by Team Yamaha.

In 1995, Windham took five podium finishes in the 125cc East Region Supercross Series, with a best result of second at Minneapolis. He finished that series in fifth overall. He also had some strong performances in the outdoor nationals with a top 125cc Motocross finish of fifth at Delmont, PA.

1996 was a breakthrough year for Windham, with six supercross wins he scored his first 125cc West Coast Championship. Later that year, he won four 125cc Nationals and placed second to Steve Lamson in the championship.

In 1997, Windham had another strong season. He won all but two rounds of the 125 West Region Supercross series and earned his second title in as many years. He also had 125cc National Motocross overall wins at Buchanan, MI, New Berlin, NY, and Delmont, PA. Windham also made history by winning a 250cc Supercross main event in Charlotte, NC while still a full-time 125cc rider. He was the first person, and so far only, in motocross history to do this.

In 1998, Windham moved to the 250cc class full-time for Yamaha and won the New Orleans and St. Louis 250cc Supercross rounds. he took five additional podium finishes and finished outside the top-ten just once in the 1998 Supercross series. He finished 4th overall. He took podium finishes in the 250cc Motocross National races at Budds Creek, MD, and New Berlin, NY, but failed to score an overall victory. He broke his leg at the Washougal, WA, event and withdrew from the series. After a bitter contract dispute, Windham signed with Team Honda for the 1999 season.

In the 1999 season, after some initial struggles adapting to his new bike, Windham hit his stride and won two Supercross main events and four motocross Nationals. He finished the outdoor season ranked second behind Greg Albertyn. Windham and Sebastien Tortelli both posed strong challenges to Albertyn all season, but eventually came up short. It is regarded as one of the most competitive motocross seasons ever.

The same year, Windham decided to race the USGP being held at Budd's Creek, MD only a few days prior to the event. European Champion and motocross hero overseas Stefan Everts made a comment concerning the top US racers deciding not to race the GP, rather to focus on the US races and the time off the week end allowed. Everts said he thought the US racers were being cowards. This angered Windham greatly; he would go on to give a passionate performance, leading him to secure the overall win.

The 2000 season was more of a challenge to Windham, as he scored just one supercross victory at Dallas, TX, and lost both the supercross title to Jeremy McGrath and the outdoor title to Ricky Carmichael, who was in his rookie 250cc National season.

For 2001, hoping for a positive change, Windham switched to Team Suzuki. It was a tough season, as it saw the beginning of Carmichael's domination for years to come. Windham did turn things around outdoors though, winning six motos. A titanic duel at the Washougal National between Carmichael and Windham is known as one of the best races ever, with Windham gaining the upper hand in both motos. He also won the season finale at Delmont, PA.

In 2002, Windham began the season for Team Sobe Suzuki with a broken finger, and had difficulty adjusting to the race situation with crowds and lights. He also had problems with fitness, suffering arm pump, and fired his trainer. Windham broke his femur in a horrific crash in Atlanta. Windham did not return to the circuit that season and many speculated that he would retire at the young age of 23, however the rest allowed him to fully recover mentally and physically.

In 2003, Windham missed the supercross series to spend time with Dottie and their new-born daughter. After over a year off, Windham announced his comeback for the 250cc Nationals aboard a Factory Connection Honda CRF450R. With an emphasis on having fun and just enjoying the sport, Windham rode better than ever before, claiming two overall victories at Unadilla and Washougal, and finishing on the podium at all but two events. He placed second to the champion Carmichael and cemented his status as a fan favorite.

Carmichael withdrew from the 2004 Supercross season for knee surgery. After a long battle with Yamaha's Chad Reed, Windham claimed 5 victories but still finished second to Reed in the title chase. By his standards, Windham had a mediocre summer and failed to win any races, finishing a distant third in the championship.

In 2005, several weeks before the start of the season, Windham's mechanic committed suicide. Windham went on to win the muddy opening round in Anaheim. After a season long battle, he ended third in the championship behind Carmichael and Reed, but ahead of James Stewart. Windham won just one moto that summer at Unadilla, but was the only rider who could keep Carmichael in sight and finished 2nd overall once again. Teamed with Carmichael and 125cc Champion Ivan Tedesco, Windham helped his team win the 2005 Motocross des Nations in Ernee, France.

Before the 2006 season, Windham broke his arm in training and returned near the end of the supercross season. He rode a consistent outdoor series to finish a strong second overall once again.

The 2007 Supercross season was lackluster for Windham, he had some good races and podium finishes, but went winless to end the season fourth overall. Carmichael had switched to a partial schedule, and Windham was beaten by eventual champion Stewart, Reed and Tim Ferry. The outdoor season began with similar results, with Windham finishing off the podium. But once the series headed to Unadilla, Windham broke through with his first outdoor overall victory since 2003 and first moto win since 2005. Windham would win the final moto of the season at Glen Helen Raceway. His series was up and down, and he finished a close fifth overall.

2008 would be one of Windham's best supercross seasons ever. He never once finished outside the top-five, and finished up the season with four overall victories, including the Daytona supercross. The Daytona race was one of the most difficult in memory, as torrential rain flooded the course, making for treacherous conditions. Windham would take the win after Chad Reed's bike quit with just a few turns to go. As the season went on, Windham would pressure Reed extremely hard, and proved to be the fastest rider near the end of the series, but ended up falling a few points short of the title. He again finished second in the championship.

2009 was bad luck for the Geico Powersports Honda rider. Windham collided with James Stewart in the season opener while running in the top-five, finishing 15th. And a DNF in Indianapolis, while he was running in third.

In the 2010 supercross series, Windham showed he had what it takes to contend despite his age. He held the fastest qualifying times at a number of events including Atlanta, Georgia and Jacksonville, Florida. He found himself on the podium more than once. Windham won two consecutive races at one point, in Seattle and Salt Lake City. At the end of 2010, he signed a two-year extension to his contract with Geico Powersports Honda.

In 2011, Windham finished the Supercross season in seventh position. He rode the first half of the 450 Class Motocross Championship, filling in for injured Honda riders Trey Canard and Josh Grant, achieving a number of top-ten finishes. He volunteered to join GEICO Honda teammates Justin Barcia and Eli Tomac to replace Christophe Pourcel, injured two weeks before, at the 29th annual Supercross of Bercy at Omnisport Paris, however he was unable to finalize travel documents in time.

In 2012, Windham continued with Geico Powersports Honda, entering his 19th season as a professional motocross racer. However, while battling with James Stewart Jr. on the final lap during Heat of Round 13 at Houston, Windham crashed hard and suffered several injuries. Consequently, Windham was out for the remainder of the 2012 Supercross Season.

In 2018, Windham took part at the most prestigious motocross event in the world known as the Motocross of Nations representing none other than Puerto Rico, he was invited to be part of the team by Travis Pastrana, Pastrana's Puerto Rican roots made him want to raise awareness for the situation in Puerto Rico after Hurricane Maria and made it his duty to do something about it. He contacted Gabriel Catala from the Puerto Rican motorcycling federation and it all took off from there. The team consisted of Travis Pastrana, Ryan Sipes and Windham Windham. The team ultimately won the B-Final to make it to the main event, making them a popular team at Red Bud Motocross.

=== Career highlights ===
- 2010 2nd (SX)
- 2008 2nd (SX)
- 2006 2nd (250MX)
- 2005 3rd (SX), 2nd (250MX), team 1st Motocross des Nations
- 2004 2nd (SX), 3rd (250MX)
- 2003 2nd (250MX)
- 2001 2nd (250MX)
- 2000 3rd (250MX)
- 1999 2nd (250MX)
- 1997 1st (WSX), 2nd (125MX)
- 1996 1st (WSX), 2nd (125MX)

== AMA Supercross/Motocross results ==
Year	Rnd 1	Rnd 2	Rnd 3	Rnd 4	Rnd 5	Rnd 6	Rnd 7	Rnd 8	Rnd 9	Rnd 10	Rnd 11	Rnd 12	Rnd 13	Rnd 14	Rnd 15	Rnd 16	Rnd 17	Average Finish	Podium Percent	Place
1996 SX-W	-	1	1	1	OUT	-	-	1	3	-	-	-	-	1	1	-	-	1.28	100%	1st
1996 125 MX	OUT	5	1	1	4	4	8	2	2	9	4	1	1	-	-	-	-	3.50	50%	2nd
1997 SX-W	1	8	1	6	-	-	-	1	1	-	-	-	-	1	1	-	-	2.50	75%	1st
1997 125 MX	3	11	4	8	11	3	1	1	6	3	2	2	1	-	-	-	-	4.30	62%	2nd
1999 250 MX	17	1	4	9	1	1	3	OUT	2	3	1	2	-	-	-	-	-	4.00	73%	2nd
2000 250 MX	5	2	2	4	3	3	5	2	7	8	6	6	-	-	-	-	-	4.41	42%	3rd
2001 250 MX	3	4	2	5	4	6	4	3	1	3	2	1	-	-	-	-	-	3.16	58%	2nd
2003 250 MX	5	4	2	3	3	2	1	1	4	2	2	-	-	-	-	-	-	2.63	73%	2nd
2004 250 SX	9	1	2	2	1	6	2	1	2	2	2	2	4	2	1	1	-	2.50	81%	2nd
2004 250 MX	4	2	3	4	2	4	3	3	2	6	2	11	-	-	-	-	-	3.83	58%	3rd
2005 250 SX	1	2	3	9	20	3	5	3	3	5	4	7	3	2	4	3	-	4.81	56%	3rd
2005 250 MX	9	3	4	4	2	2	2	2	2	2	2	2	-	-	-	-	-	3.00	75%	2nd
2006 450 MX	7	11	5	3	4	2	4	7	3	3	3	4	-	-	-	-	-	4.67	50%	2nd
2008 450 SX	5	3	3	2	4	5	1	2	5	1	3	2	4	3	1	1	2	2.76	71%	2nd
2010 450 SX	3	6	5	11	16	3	3	14	4	5	7	4	2	2	1	1	3	5.29	47%	2nd

== Personal ==
Born in Baton Rouge, Louisiana, Windham began riding motorcycles from the age of three with friends in the spillways around the New Orleans area. He is married to Dottie. They met at around age twelve, when Dottie went with her sister to watch a race at the local motocross track. The couple have four children; daughters Madelyn, Annabelle and Elizabeth, and son Kevin Jr. Windham lists his non-motocross hobbies as "anything outdoors", including bmx, fishing and flying his own plane.
