= Jeremy McGrath =

American motorcycle racer

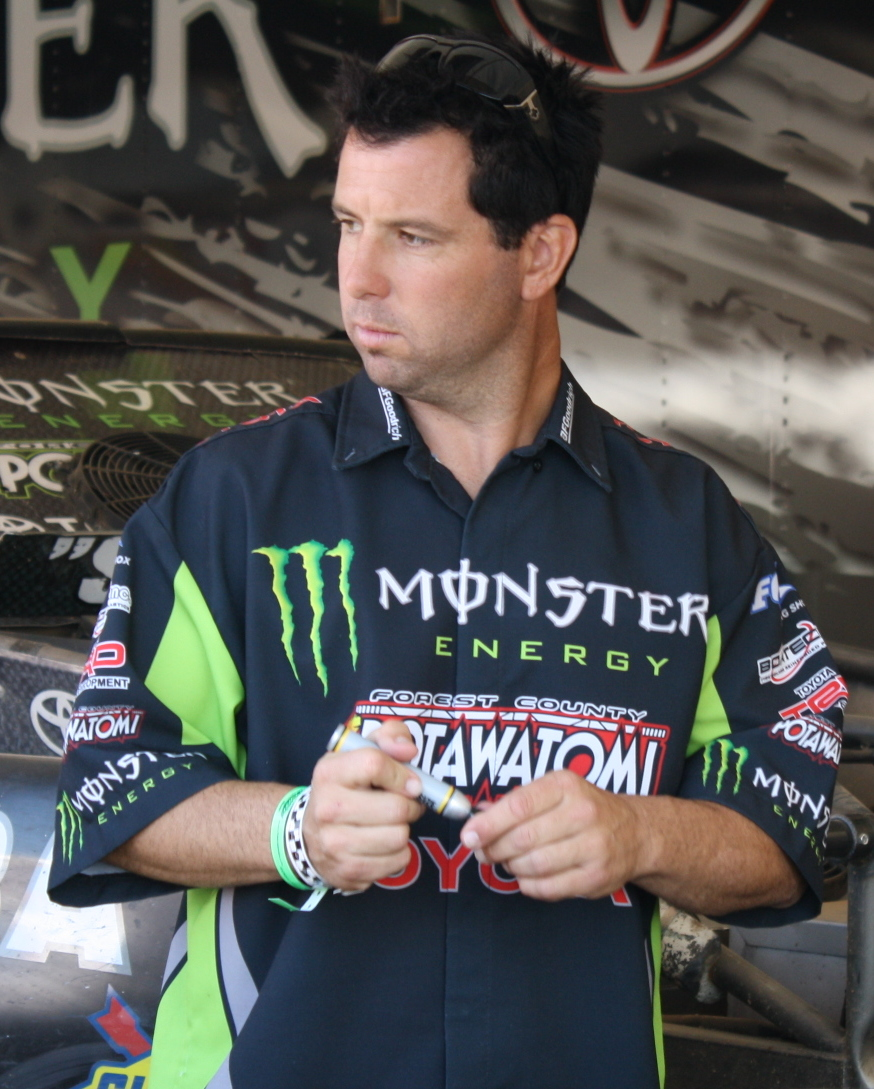
- McGrath signing autographs in 2009
- Nationality: American
- Born: November 19, 1971 (age 54) San Francisco, California, U.S.

Motocross career
- Years active: 1989–2006
- Teams: •Kawasaki; •Honda; •Suzuki; •Yamaha
- Championships: •1991 AMA Supercross 125cc West; •1992 AMA Supercross 125cc West; •1993 AMA Supercross 250cc; •1994 AMA Supercross 250cc; •1995 AMA Supercross 250cc; •1995 AMA Motocross 250cc; •1996 AMA Supercross 250cc; •1998 AMA Supercross 250cc; •1999 AMA Supercross 250cc; •2000 AMA Supercross 250cc
- Wins: •AMA 125cc Supercross: 13; •AMA 125cc Motocross: 2; •AMA 250cc Supercross: 72; •AMA 250cc Motocross: 15; Total: 102
Medal record
Summer X Games
Representing United States
Gold medal – first place	2004 Los Angeles	Moto X Step Up
Silver medal – second place	2005 Los Angeles	Supermoto
Silver medal – second place	2006 Los Angeles	Moto X Step Up
Silver medal – second place	2008 Los Angeles	Moto X Racing
Bronze medal – third place	2004 Los Angeles	Supermoto

Jeremy Christopher McGrath (born November 19, 1971) is an American former professional motocross and supercross racer. Considered one of the most popular and influential riders in the history of motorcycle racing, McGrath won seven AMA Supercross 250cc championships, one 250cc AMA Motocross championship, two 125cc West championships and a record 72 premier class supercross wins. He was also a two-time FIM Supercross World Champion as well as a two-time Team USA Motocross des Nations winner.

During his career, Supercross experienced significant growth in audience size and media coverage, much of it centered around the dominance and showmanship of McGrath, leading to him being coined the "King of Supercross". Another of McGrath's nicknames, "Showtime," is partly derived from his iconic "nac-nac" move, which helped to spawn what would become known as freestyle motocross. However, McGrath's popularity transcended the world of motorcycles, taking small roles in the movies Charlie's Angels: Full Throttle and Motocrossed, appearing on The Tonight Show with Jay Leno, licensing a video game series named after him, and featuring in several other offroad racing-related video game titles.

Since retiring from motorcycle racing, McGrath has pursued various other forms of racing both on and off-road, as well as various business ventures he is involved with.

== Early life ==
Jeremy McGrath was born on November 19, 1971, in San Francisco, California. At a young age, his family moved to Southern California, where he began to ride bikes with a neighborhood friend. In 1982, around the age of ten, McGrath was entering BMX racing events around Lake Elsinore, California, eventually participating in up to ten races a week. By 1985, McGrath was nationally ranked, winning Nationals in the cruiser class. This same year, he was given a Yamaha YZ80 as a gift for his 14th birthday. McGrath did not pursue motorcycle racing until the following year, when in 1986 he raced at Perris Raceway in Perris, California, beating everyone in his class. After that, McGrath's interest in motocross grew significantly, distancing himself from racing BMX from that point onward.

== Career ==
=== Motorcycle racing ===
McGrath began racing motocross at the age of 15 after a successful career in BMX. He placed eighth in the 125cc West Region supercross season of 1989. In 1990, he won his first supercross race and placed second in that season. McGrath won the 125 West supercross title in 1991 and 1992.

McGrath won a record of seventy-two 250cc main events and captured seven 250cc supercross championships between 1993 and 2000, a time now known as the "McGrath Era". He also won the 1995 250 Outdoor motocross championship and had the 1996 title in sight before a late-season injury handed the title to Jeff Emig. He described the loss as follows: "I get mad at myself a little bit because I should've won the '96 title too, but I was thinking I was invincible and tried a jump at Millville that I never should have attempted and got injured." McGrath also participated in two victories by the U.S. team at the Motocross des Nations –1993 in Austria and 1996 in Spain. His 1998, 1999, 2000 seasons with The Chaparral Motorsports race team was the 1st non-factory team in the history of the sport to win a Supercross championship

At the start of the 2001 season, McGrath won two of the first three rounds. However, Team Kawasaki's Ricky Carmichael went on to win every race from there on out; dethroning McGrath as Supercross champion and matching his 1996 win record of 13 consecutive main event victories. McGrath returned in 2002 to take a shot at regaining his crown, but chronic arm pump and compartment syndrome limited his efforts, but still managing a third place overall in the series behind Carmichael and Yamaha's David Vuillemin.

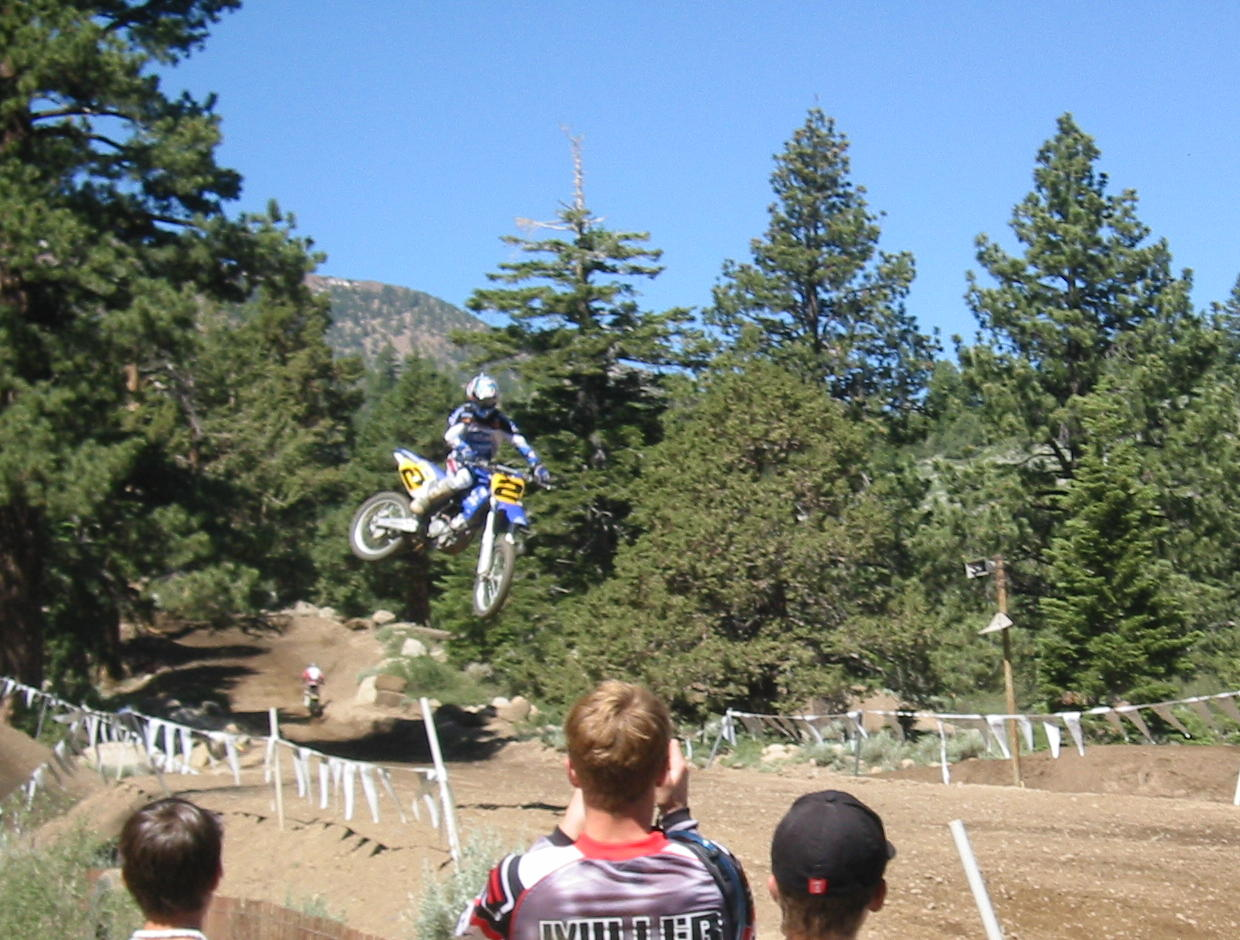
McGrath at the Mammoth Motocross 2002

In 2003, McGrath signed with KTM; however, a pre-season crash led McGrath to reconsider his future in racing, ultimately leading to his decision to retire just before the start of the 2003 Supercross season. He did a farewell tour with KTM to show his appreciation and sign autographs for fans.

In 2005, McGrath came out of retirement to race a limited schedule on the supercross circuit. He rejoined forces with his former Team Honda squad and has recently proven to be at a competitive level and speed that has not been seen from McGrath since the 2001 season. At the age of 34, he placed regularly in the top-five positions. In the same year, McGarth also raced Supermoto in the X-Games and placed second to take home the silver medal. McGrath switched motorcycles from his trademark Honda CR250R 2-stroke to a Honda CRF450R 4-stroke at Round 3 of the 2006 Supercross season. In keeping with his partial schedule, McGrath withdrew from the series after Round Six, after earning multiple top-five finishes, and running as high as fourth in the point standings. McGarth competed in the 2006 Summer X Games; earning a second in Step-Up and seventh in Supermoto. He announced plans for the McGrath Invitational; an off-season supercross race with an innovative track and rider purse. McGrath announced that the 2006 Invitational would be the final professional Supercross race of his career.

McGarth holds the third best record for most combined AMA supercross and motocross victories with 102 career wins; only Ricky Carmichael and James Stewart have won more.

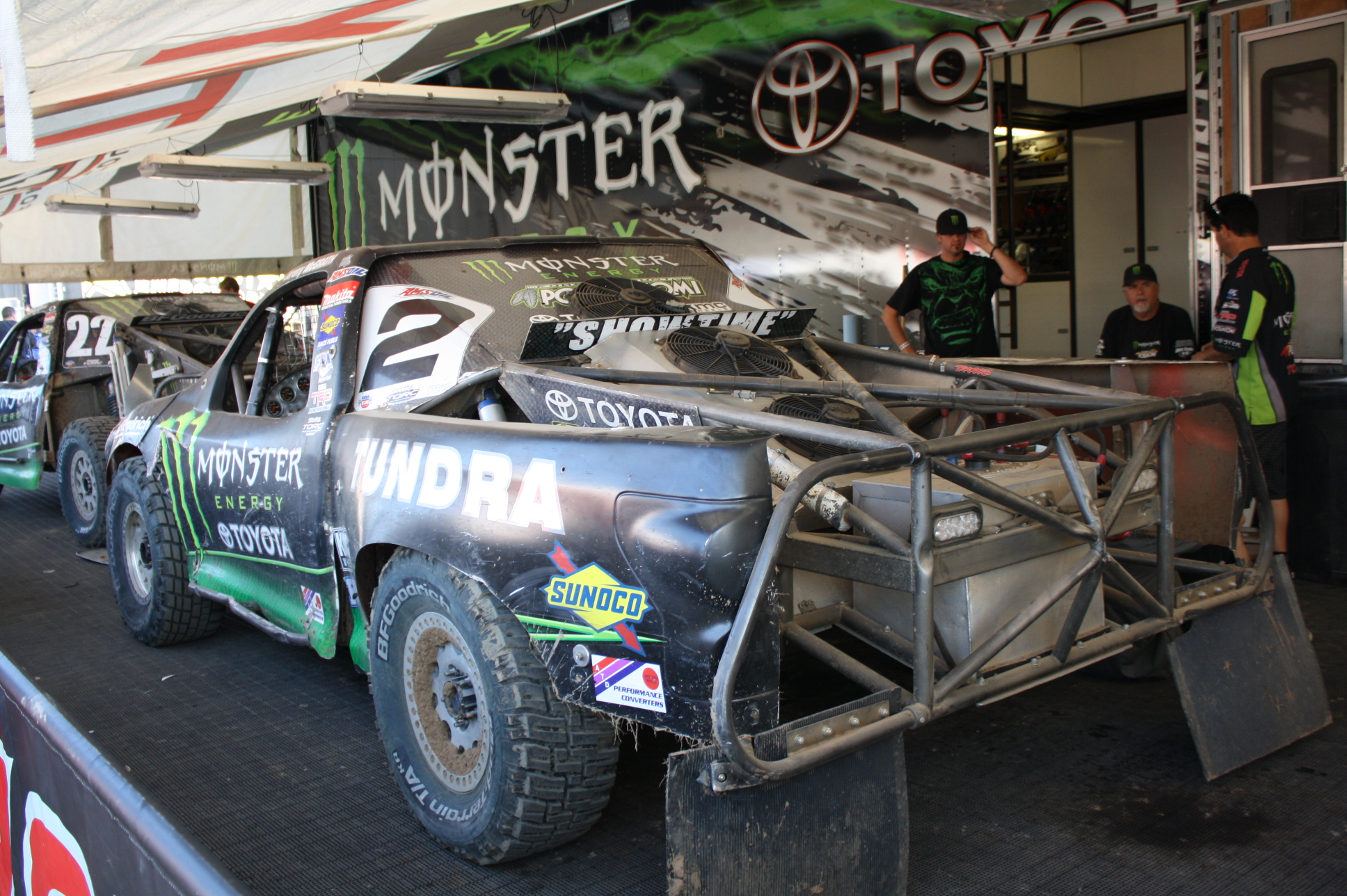
McGrath's 2009 Short Course Offroad Truck

=== Other racing pursuits ===
In April 2007, McGrath announced he had signed a driver development contract with the NASCAR team JR Motorsports, with Monster Energy Drink as his prime sponsor.

In the 2010s, McGarth transitioned into off-road truck racing, competing in the Pro 2 division of the Lucas Oil Off Road Racing Series (LOORRS). In 2017, McGrath won the Pro 2 class championship in the series.

McGrath has occasionally raced in off-road races in the late 2000s. He has finished in the top-ten in several PRO-2 races. In 2017, he won the championship in the Pro 2 division of the Lucas Oil Off Road Racing Series.

Since 2016, McGrath has partnered with Kawasaki to host a weekly video series, entitled "Science of Supercross", which is hosted on YouTube and featured as a portion of the live broadcast of Supercross when the series is active. Occasionally, McGrath has guest-commentated Supercross races as well.

=== Other business ventures ===
==== Jeremy McGrath Supercross ====
A video game series based on McGrath's motocross career, titled Jeremy McGrath Supercross, debuted in 1998. In early installments, McGrath was the primary character, but later games introduced customizable riders while still featuring him in various gameplay modes as a competitor and mentor, offering players insights into motocross racing strategies.

==== Pole Position Raceway ====
In September 2005, McGrath teamed up with long-time friends Ken Faught and Jason Williams to create a state-of-the-art indoor go-kart track called Pole Position Raceway. The track uses environmentally friendly electric karts that produce 20-horsepower.

==== ARMA Sport Inc. ====
In February 2020, McGrath co-founded Arma Sport Inc. along with Scott Sepkovic, founder of Spy Optics and CrownAMG, and fellow motocross rider Nick Wey. The company produces a line of sports nutrition products.

== Career results ==
=== Motocross and Supercross ===
Year	Rnd 1	Rnd 2	Rnd 3	Rnd 4	Rnd 5	Rnd 6	Rnd 7	Rnd 8	Rnd 9	Rnd 10	Rnd 11	Rnd 12	Rnd 13	Rnd 14	Rnd 15	Rnd 16	Rnd 17	Rnd 18	Average Finish	Podium Percent	Place
1990 125 SX-W	7	21	2	2	-	-	1	3	3	-	-	-	-	-	-	2	6	3	5.00	70%	2nd
~1991 125 SX-W	-	2	1	1	1	-	-	3	-	-	-	-	1	1	-	OUT	9	OUT	2.40	88%	1st
1992 125 SX-W	-	3	1	1	1	-	-	-	-	-	-	-	1	1	1	1	-	-	1.25	100%	1st
1993 250 SX	4	5	1	1	1	1	4	2	1	1	2	1	1	1	1	9	-	-	2.25	75%	1st
1993 125 MX	1	13	3	1	2	2	4	6	3	3	2	5	-	-	-	-	-	-	3.75	67%	3rd
1994 250 SX	1	1	1	1	5	1	4	1	7	1	1	3	3	2	1	-	-	-	2.20	80%	1st
1994 250 MX	6	2	3	4	12	8	2	3	2	6	2	-	-	-	-	-	-	-	4.54	54%	3rd
1995 250 SX	1	1	1	1	1	4	7	1	1	5	1	2	1	1	DNS	-	-	-	2.00	79%	1st
1995 250 MX	1	6	3	1	2	1	1	2	2	1	1	1	-	-	-	-	-	-	1.83	92%	1st
1996 250 SX	1	1	1	1	1	1	1	1	1	1	1	1	1	2	1	-	-	-	1.13	100%	1st
1996 250 MX	1	1	1	3	1	1	2	2	1	6	15	1	2	-	-	-	-	-	2.84	85%	2nd
1997 250 SX	15	3	2	2	9	3	3	1	3	2	1	4	7	4	7	-	-	-	4.40	60%	2nd
1997 250 MX	2	5	4	7	3	5	3	8	3	8	3	5	6	-	-	-	-	-	4.84	38%	3rd
1998 250 SX	3	2	2	1	1	1	1	8	1	2	1	4	20	14	2	1	-	-	4.00	75%	1st
1998 250 MX	2	1	6	-	-	-	-	-	-	-	-	-	-	-	-	-	-	-	3.00	66%	14th
1999 250 SX	7	2	1	4	2	2	1	4	1	1	1	1	1	2	4	1	-	-	2.19	75%	1st
1999 250 MX	10	-	-	-	-	-	-	-	8	-	-	-	-	-	-	-	-	-	-	-	-
2000 250 SX	1	1	4	2	1	1	1	1	2	1	3	1	4	2	1	1	-	-	1.69	88%	1st
2000 250 MX	6	-	-	-	-	-	-	-	-	-	-	-	-	-	-	-	-	-	-	-	-
2001 250 SX	1	3	1	2	2	2	2	4	6	2	2	4	4	3	6	2	-	-	2.88	69%	2nd
2002 250 SX	13	10	9	6	6	7	6	3	5	4	5	4	3	3	5	5	-	-	5.80	19%	3rd

- 250cc AMA Supercross Championships: 7 (1993, 1994, 1995, 1996, 1998, 1999 and 2000)
- 125cc AMA Western Region SX Championships: 2 (1991 and 1992)
- 250cc AMA National Motocross Championships: 1 (1995)
- FIM World SX Championships: 2
- Member of Winning US Motocross des Nations Team: 2 (1993 and 1996)

Overall AMA Career Wins: 102

- 250cc AMA Supercross wins: 72
- 250cc AMA National Motocross wins: 15
- 125cc AMA Western Region SX wins: 13
- 125cc AMA National Motocross wins: 2

=== X Games competition history ===
GOLD (1) SILVER (3) BRONZE (1)
YEAR	X GAMES	EVENTS	RANK	MEDAL
2004	Summer X Games X	Moto X Step Up	1st	Gold medal
2004	Summer X Games X	Supermoto	3rd	Bronze medal
2005	Summer X Games XI	Moto X Step Up	3rd	
2005	Summer X Games XI	Supermoto	2nd	Silver medal
2006	Summer X Games XII	Moto X Step Up	2nd	Silver medal
2006	Summer X Games XII	Supermoto	8th	
2007	Summer X Games XIII	Moto X Step Up	5th	
2007	Summer X Games XIII	Supermoto	5th	
2008	Summer X Games XIV	Moto X Racing	2nd	Silver medal
2009	Summer X Games XV	Moto X Step Up	4th	

== Awards ==
McGrath won the AMA Pro Athlete of the Year Award in 1996.

In 2009, McGrath was inducted into the BMX Hall of Fame, alongside Troy Lee and several other accomplished racers.

McGrath was inducted into the Motorsports Hall of Fame of America in 2010.

== Personal life ==
=== Family ===
McGrath has been married since 2002 and has two children with his wife.

=== Books ===
McGrath wrote an autobiography with Chris Palmer called "Wide Open: A Life in Supercross". It talks about his life going through the ranks as a rookie to his current day life.

Former Dirt Rider editor-in-chief Ken Faught, a long-time friend of the McGrath family, wrote "Images of a Champion". The book documents his on-and-off track activities including car racing, hillclimbing and supermoto.
