= Ricky Carmichael =

American motorcycle and stock car racing driver

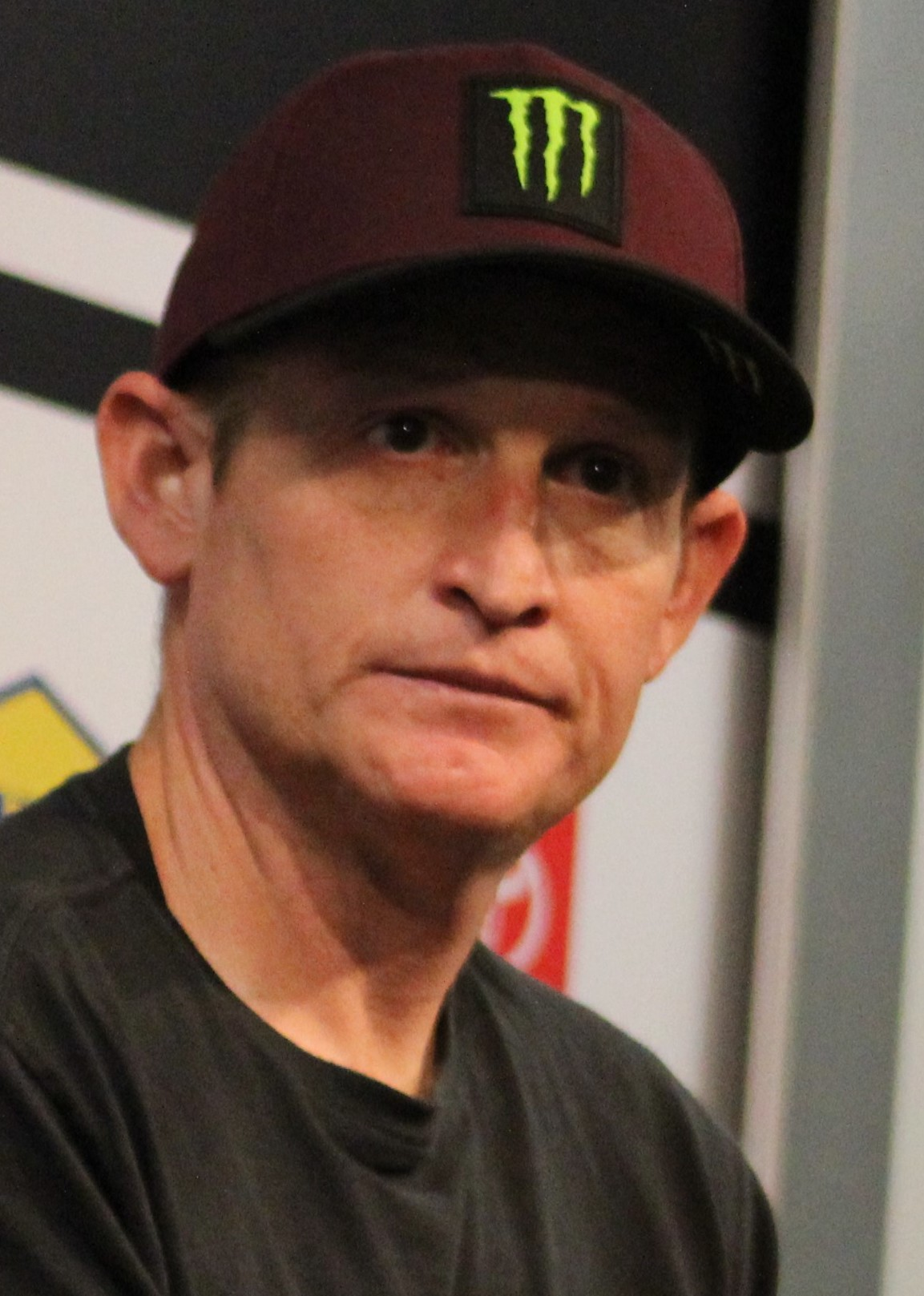
- Carmichael at Daytona International Speedway in 2020
- Born: November 27, 1979 (age 46); Clearwater, Florida, U.S.
- Achievements: 5× AMA Supercross 450cc(250cc) Champion; 7× AMA Motocross 450cc(250cc) Champion; 3× AMA Motocross 250cc(125cc) Champion; AMA Supercross East Supercross 250cc(125cc) Champion
- Awards: 2009 NASCAR Camping World Truck Series Most Popular Driver

NASCAR O'Reilly Auto Parts Series career
- 8 races run over 2 years
- 2011 position: 113th
- Best finish: 84th (2010)
- First race: 2010 Kansas Lottery 300 (Kansas)
- Last race: 2011 Wypall 200 (Phoenix)
Wins	Top tens	Poles
0	1	0

NASCAR FedEx Freight Truck Series career
- 68 races run over 3 years
- 2011 position: 16th
- Best finish: 13th (2010)
- First race: 2008 NextEra Energy Resources 250 (Daytona)
- Last race: 2011 Ford 200 (Homestead)
Wins	Top tens	Poles
0	18	1
Medal record
Summer X Games
Representing United States
Gold medal – first place	2007 Los Angeles	Moto X Racing
Gold medal – first place	2008 Los Angeles	Moto X Step Up
Gold medal – first place	2009 Los Angeles	Moto X Step Up
Bronze medal – third place	2009 Los Angeles	Moto X Best Whip
Bronze medal – third place	World of X Real Moto 2019	MTX Real Moto
- Statistics up to date as of June 13, 2020.

Richard Joseph Carmichael (born November 27, 1979) is an American former professional motocross and supercross racer. Carmichael won 15 AMA Motocross and Supercross championships, including a record-setting seven AMA Motocross 450cc championships and five AMA Supercross 450cc titles. He holds the record for the most overall motocross wins in AMA history (150 wins) and was twice undefeated in the outdoor motocross series (2002, 2004). His dominance in the sport has earned him the nickname "The GOAT", standing for Greatest of All Time. He also represented Team USA in the Motocross des Nations three times, contributing to several victories.

After retiring from professional motocross in 2007, Carmichael transitioned to stock car racing, competing in the ARCA Racing Series and NASCAR Camping World Truck Series between 2008 and 2011. He secured multiple top-ten finishes before returning focus to motocross-related ventures.

Today, Carmichael remains active in the motocross industry, involving himself with track design and commentating on supercross broadcasts. In 2021, he announced his partnership with Triumph Motorcycles in the development of their new offroad line, leading to the debut of the TF 450-RC in 2024. Carmichael’s former training compound, known as the GOAT Farm, became the official headquarters of the Monster Energy Star Racing Yamaha team in 2021 after the program relocated from California. The team expanded and modernized the facility, adding new tracks, testing areas, and infrastructure to support its 250 and 450 operations. The GOAT Farm now serves as a centralized base for rider development, machine testing, and year‑round training. Its transition from Carmichael’s personal training grounds to a major factory‑supported program reflects the property’s continued importance within professional motocross and its role in shaping emerging talent.

== Racing career ==
=== Motocross/supercross ===
After a dominant amateur career, Carmichael made his professional debut in 1997 for the Splitfire Pro Circuit Kawasaki team. In his rookie Supercross effort, he showed promising speed, winning multiple main events. However, crashes and inconsistency ultimately cost him the title of Suzuki's Tim Ferry. Outdoors, Carmichael was more consistent, beating defending champion Steve Lamson for the overall win at round 1, and went on to win the overall 125cc title.

In 1998 Carmichael proved his ability to dominate indoors as well, winning all 8 of the 125cc East Supercross rounds, as well as the "East/West Shoot-Out" event. Outdoors, he defended his title comfortably despite early challenges from Lamson, John Dowd, and Mike Brown.

Carmichael jumped to the 250 class for Supercross in 1999 with the Factory Kawasaki team. He had moderate success in the early rounds, including top-five finishes, but frequent crashes throughout the remainder of the season resulted in a finish outside of the top-ten of the final standings. For the outdoor season, he remained in the 125cc class, which he won handily for a third consecutive year. In 2000, Carmichael moved to the 250 class full-time. He showed more consistency in Supercross, getting his first premier class race win at Daytona. He finished fifth overall in the final standings. Carmichael again displayed his outdoor prowess in the 2000 AMA Motocross championship, winning the title in his rookie year despite challenges from Sébastien Tortelli.

Leading into the 2001 Supercross season, Carmichael showed a newfound commitment to his physical conditioning, bringing on former professional cyclist Aldon Baker to oversee his training regimen. After contests in the early rounds from defending 250 Supercross Champion Jeremy McGrath, Carmichael established himself as the new leader of the class, winning 13 of 15 rounds along with the championship. He then continued his streak of outdoor titles as well, fending off challengers Sébastien Tortelli and Kevin Windham.

Carmichael moved to a new manufacturer, Honda, for the 2002 season. Despite a violent crash in round 1 of Supercross, he quickly rebounded and went on to win 11 of 16 rounds, as well his second 250 title over runner-up David Vuillemin. In the 2002 outdoor championship, Carmichael won an unprecedented 24 of 24 motos to take his third consecutive 250 outdoor title.

==== 2003–2007 ====
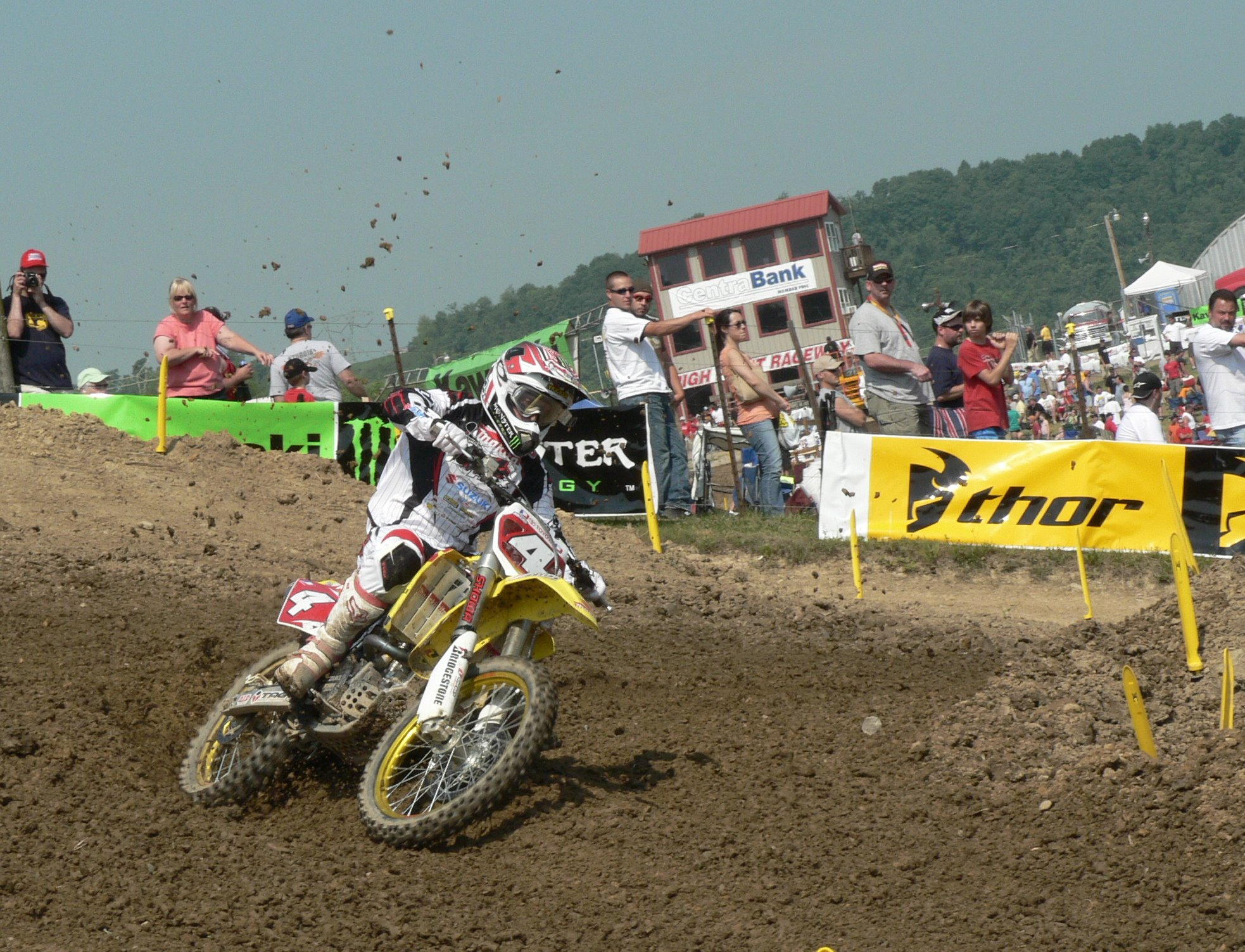
Carmichael in 2007

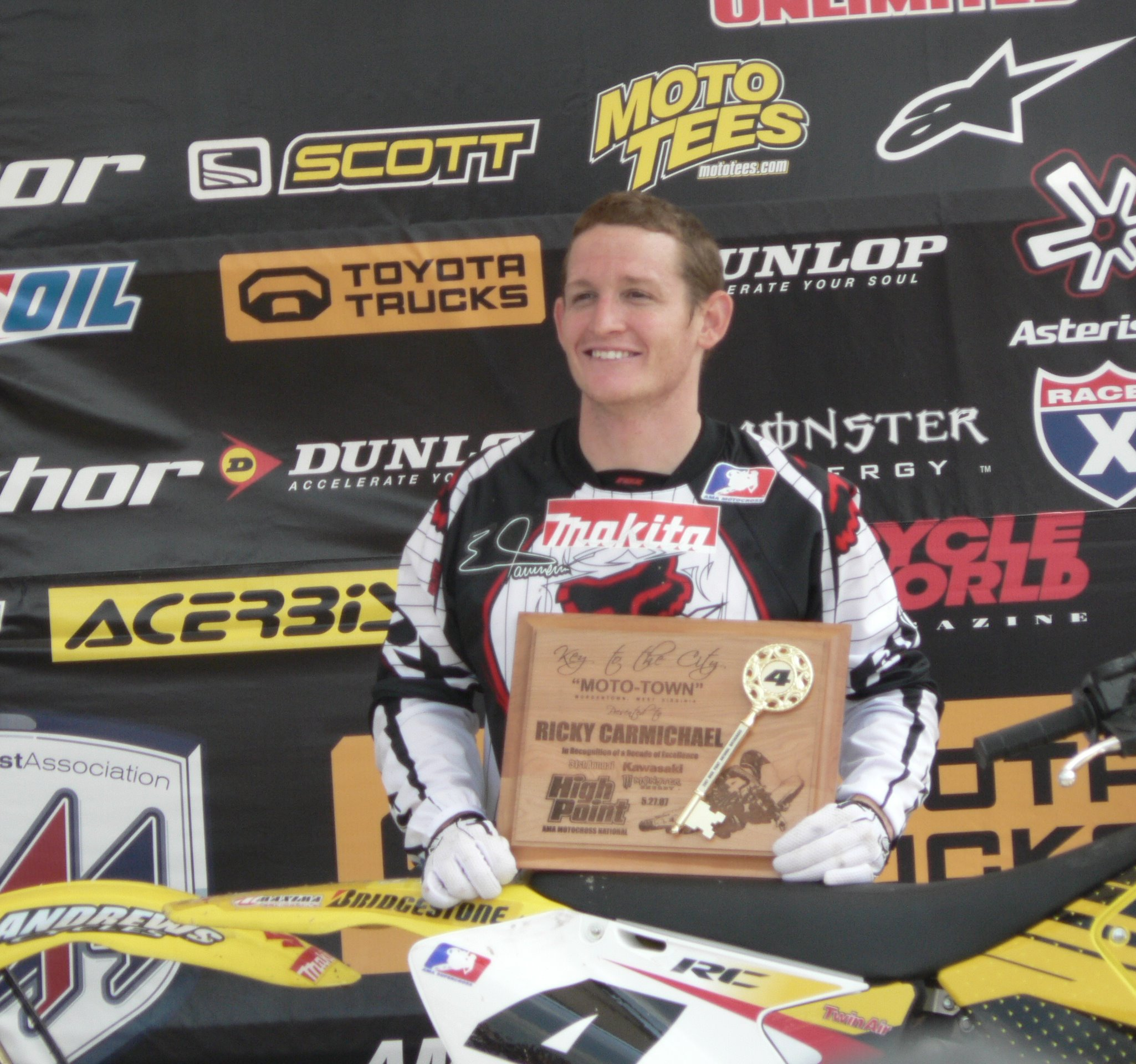
Carmichael receiving a Key to the City of Morgantown, West Virginia ("Moto-Town") in 2007

In 2003, Carmichael won both Supercross and National titles again; winning seven races indoors where he faced a stiff challenge from Chad Reed. He won the National title again with nine race wins over Windham.

In 2004, Carmichael was injured for the Supercross season, he had a knee injury (torn ligaments/meniscus) but came back for the Motocross season to record his second perfect season; winning 24 of the 24 motos he raced and all 12 overalls on his Honda CRF 450; his first effort on a 4-stroke bike.

Carmichael entered the 2005 season as the underdog, due to missing the prior season with the knee injury, now as a Suzuki factory rider. In what was projected as "the perfect storm", James "Bubba" Stewart made his debut in the premier 250cc class, along with perennial contenders Chad Reed and Kevin Windham, Carmichael triumphantly regained his Supercross title, with seven victories to Reed's five, Stewart's three, and Windham's one. Later that summer, Carmichael won all 12 events in the 250cc Outdoor National Championship again; winning 22 of 24 motos on an RMZ450. Carmichael also scored the US Open of Supercross title and led Team USA to a convincing victory at the Motocross des Nations.

Carmichael campaigned the 2006 Supercross season aboard an RMZ450; his first attempt at indoor competition on a four-stroke. It was the most exciting series battle in recent memory. There were multiple points lead changes and race winners, and Carmichael, Reed, and Stewart all entered the Las Vegas finale within five points of each other. With Carmichael and Reed tied for the lead (316 points), and Stewart (311) only five points behind them, it was a close race. Carmichael rode to a safe second-place finish behind Stewart and ended the series with six victories and his fifth Supercross championship. He indicated that 2006 would be his last full-time season and planned to retire the following year.

In the 2006 Outdoor National Championship season, Carmichael once again dominated all comers, including James Stewart, in winning nine races and placing second twice. However, at the season finale at Glen Helen Raceway, Carmichael suffered a bad crash while challenging James Stewart for the win and was unable to finish the race. Carmichael had already clinched the overall championship at the prior round. In the crash, he sustained a shoulder injury and was unable to compete in the Motocross of Nations race in England. Ivan Tedesco replaced him on Team USA and helped lead the American team to victory.

As planned, Carmichael raced only a partial schedule in 2007. He would only race select events for Team Makita Suzuki while pursuing his new stock car career. Carmichael finished with two Supercross wins and six Outdoor National wins, winning every race he entered. Carmichael capped his career with a winning performance at the X-Games and a victory with Team USA at the Motocross of Nations in Budds Creek, Maryland.

==== X Games ====
Carmichael won the gold in Supercross at the X Games in 2007, won gold in Step Up in 2008, was jointly given the gold medal in the same event in 2009 with Ronnie Renner. In 2019, he won the bronze medal in Real Moto.

=== Stock car racing ===
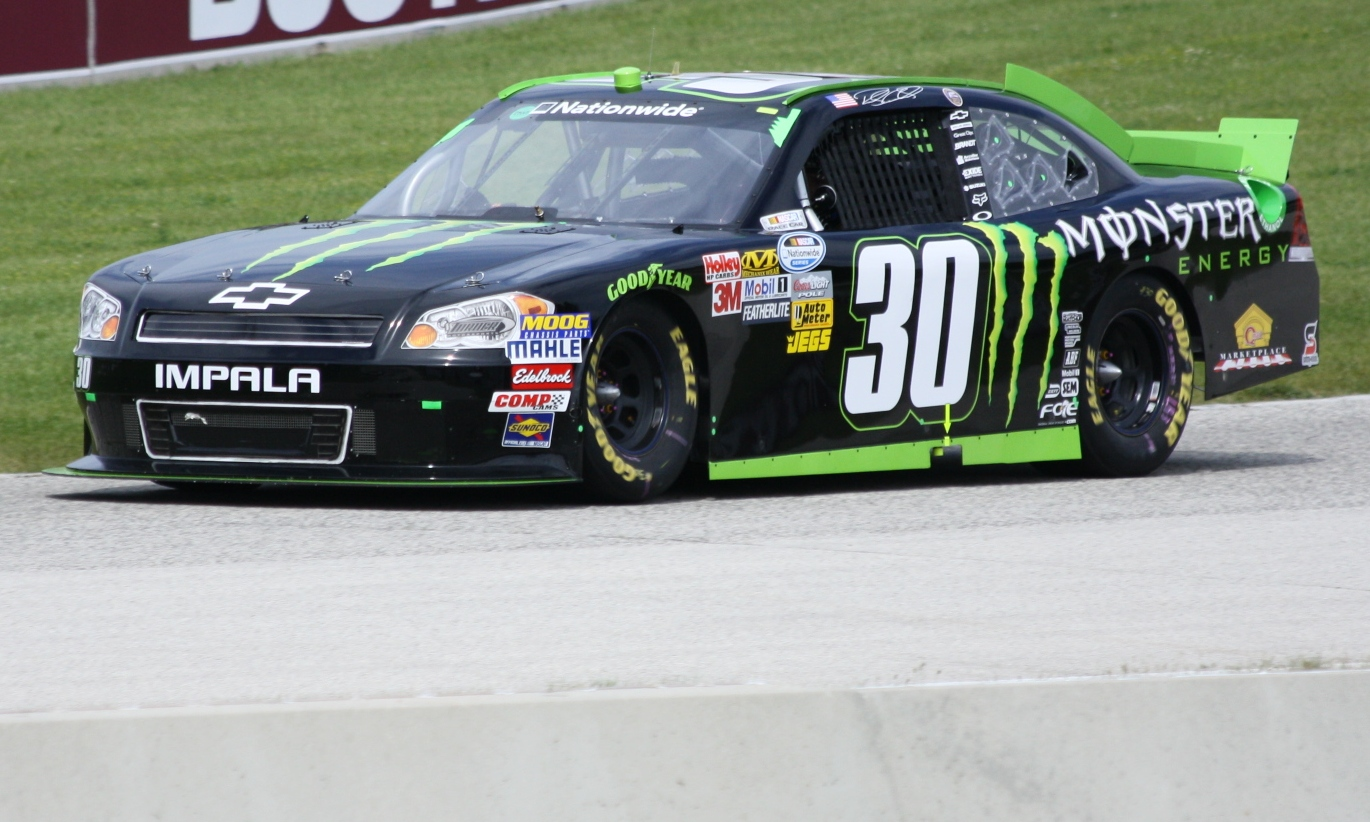
Carmichael's No. 30 for Turner Motorsports in the Nationwide Series race at Road America in 2011

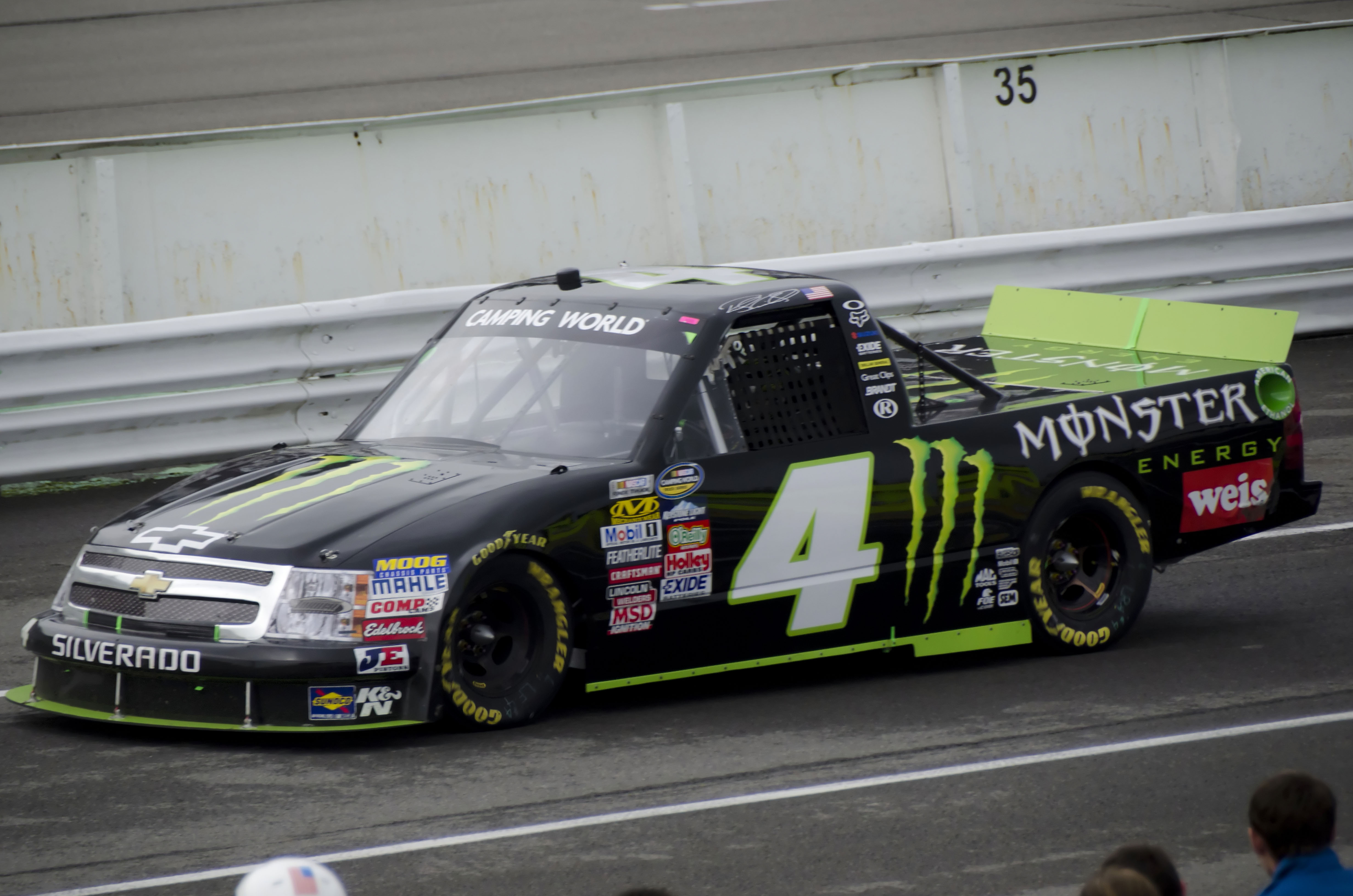
Carmichael's No. 4 for Turner Motorsports in the Truck Series race at Pocono in 2011

In 2007, Carmichael signed a driver development contract with Ginn Racing, which would later be merged with Dale Earnhardt, Inc. Under the tutelage of veteran Mark Martin, Carmichael started his transition to stock cars by racing late models throughout the country. With backing from Monster Energy, Carmichael later transitioned to Ken Schrader Racing, and ran a few races in the Camping World East Series, including the prestigious Toyota All-Star Showdown at Toyota Speedway in Irwindale, California. In 2009, Carmichael was tabbed by Sprint Cup Series driver Kevin Harvick to drive the No. 4 Chevrolet Silverado in 18 races for Harvick's team, Kevin Harvick, Inc. Though the transition wasn't easy, Carmichael finished 22nd in Truck Series points that year. In 2010, Carmichael and Monster left KHI and went to Turner Motorsports, where he would gain nine top-tens en route to finishing 13th in the points. Carmichael also made his Nationwide Series debut at Kansas Speedway, starting 12th and finishing 18th. Carmichael returned to Turner for 2011, and split the No. 30 Chevrolet in the Nationwide Series with teammates James Buescher, Reed Sorenson, Jason Leffler and Mark Martin.

On September 2, 2011, Carmichael achieved his first career pole at Atlanta Motor Speedway in the Camping World Truck Series.

== Consulting ==
On July 19, 2021, Carmichael entered into a partnership with Triumph Motorcycles. Along with World Enduro champion Ivan Cervantes, they are tasked with helping develop the prototypes for the new line of off-road motorcycles by Triumph for use in motocross and supercross.

== Sponsors ==
=== Current ===
- Fox Racing
- Monster Energy (2006–present)
- Triumph Motorcycles (2021–present)

=== Past ===
- Kawasaki motorcycles (1997–2001, 2020–2021)
- Suzuki (2005–2020)
- Honda Racing Corporation (2002–2004)

== Other activities ==
In 2009, for the BBC show Top Gear, Ken Block took James May out for Gymkhana-style driving at Block's stunt course at Inyokern Airport; an operational California airport. Carmichael appeared in a supporting role, to which Block described Carmichael as 'a good friend'.

Carmichael currently works on AMA Monster Energy SuperMotocross Broadcasts on NBC with Leigh Diffey, Jason Weigandt, James Stewart, Jason Thomas, and Will Christien.

== Awards ==
Carmichael was voted 2009 Camping World Truck Series Most Popular Driver.

In 2015, Carmichael was inducted in the Motorsports Hall of Fame of America.

== Motorsports career results ==
=== AMA Motocross / Supercross ===
Year	Rnd 1	Rnd 2	Rnd 3	Rnd 4	Rnd 5	Rnd 6	Rnd 7	Rnd 8	Rnd 9	Rnd 10	Rnd 11	Rnd 12	Rnd 13	Rnd 14	Rnd 15	Rnd 16	Average Finish	Podium Percent	Place
1997 125 SX-E	-	-	-	-	19	1	6	-	-	1	10	3	1	-	18	-	7.38	50%	3rd
1997 125 MX	1	1	1	13	1	1	2	4	2	1	1	1	3	-	-	-	2.46	85%	1st
1998 125 SX-E	-	-	-	-	-	1	1	1	1	1	-	1	1	-	1	-	1.00	100%	1st
1998 125 MX	1	3	1	9	1	1	1	1	1	1	4	5	-	-	-	-	2.41	75%	1st
1999 250 SX	6	19	-	-	-	4	14	19	4	-	18	6	11	12	7	19	11.58	-	16th
1999 125 MX	1	1	1	1	6	1	1	1	2	3	1	1	-	-	-	-	1.66	92%	1st
2000 250 SX	8	4	10	3	2	4	10	3	1	3	19	5	3	4	8	5	5.63	38%	5th
2000 250 MX	1	3	11	1	1	2	1	1	1	1	1	1	-	-	-	-	2.01	92%	1st
2001 250 SX	3	1	2	1	1	1	1	1	1	1	1	1	1	1	1	1	1.19	100%	1st
2001 250 MX	4	2	5	1	1	1	1	1	2	1	1	1	-	-	-	-	1.75	83%	1st
2002 250 SX	20	4	4	1	1	2	1	1	1	1	1	1	2	1	1	1	2.63	81%	1st
2002 250 MX	1	1	1	1	1	1	1	1	1	1	1	1	-	-	-	-	1.00	100%	1st
2003 250 SX	2	4	1	1	1	3	1	1	1	1	2	2	2	2	2	2	1.75	94%	1st
2003 250 MX	1	1	1	1	1	1	2	2	1	1	1	-	-	-	-	-	1.18	100%	1st
2004 250 SX	-	-	-	-	-	-	-	-	-	-	-	-	-	-	-	-	-	-	-
2004 250 MX	1	1	1	1	1	1	1	1	1	1	1	1	-	-	-	-	1.00	100%	1st
2005 250 SX	3	1	1	1	1	1	2	1	1	2	2	2	2	3	3	2	1.75	100%	1st
2005 250 MX	1	1	1	1	1	1	1	1	1	1	1	1	-	-	-	-	1.00	100%	1st
2006 450 SX	3	1	1	2	1	2	20	1	1	2	2	2	2	6	3	2	3.19	88%	1st
2006 450 MX	2	1	1	1	1	1	1	2	1	1	1	DNF	-	-	-	-	1.18	100%	1st
*2007 450 SX	2	DNS	DNS	2	1	DNS	DNS	DNS	2	1	2	2	DNS	DNS	DNS	DNS	1.71	100%	8th
*2007 450 MX	1	1	1	1	1	DNS	DNS	DNS	1	DNS	DNS	DNS	-	-	-	-	1.00	100%	6th

- *Ricky retired from full time racing at the end of 2006. In 2007, he raced a partial schedule in both SX and MX as a farewell tour.

Titles

- 1997 AMA 125cc/Lites Outdoor National Motocross Champion (Kawasaki)
- 1998 AMA 125cc/Lites East Coast Supercross Champion (Kawasaki) - Perfect season: 8-0
- 1998 AMA 125cc/Lites Outdoor National Motocross Champion (Kawasaki)
- 1999 AMA 125cc/Lites Outdoor National Motocross Champion (Kawasaki)
- 2000 AMA Motocross Champion (Kawasaki)
- 2001 AMA Supercross Champion (Kawasaki)
- 2001 AMA Motocross Champion (Kawasaki)
- 2002 AMA Supercross Champion (Honda)
- 2002 AMA Motocross Champion (Honda) - Perfect season: 24-0
- 2003 AMA Supercross Champion (Honda)
- 2003 AMA Motocross Champion (Honda)
- 2004 AMA Motocross Champion (Honda) - Perfect season: 24-0
- 2005 AMA Supercross Champion (Suzuki)
- 2005 AMA Motocross Champion (Suzuki)
- 2006 AMA Supercross Champion (Suzuki)
- 2006 AMA Motocross Champion (Suzuki)

Wins

- 12 Wins in 125/250 AMA Supercross
- 26 Wins in 125/250 AMA Motocross: 8 (1997), 8 (1998), 9 (1999), 1 (2001),
- 48 Wins in 250/450 AMA Supercross: 1 (2000), 14 (2001), 11 (2002), 7 (2003), 7 (2005), 6 (2006), 2 (2007)
- 76 Wins in 250/450 AMA Motocross: 9 (2000), 7 (2001), 12 (2002), 9 (2003), 12 (2004), 12 (2005), 9 (2006), 6 (2007)
- 162 Wins in AMA SX/MX: 8 (1997), 8 (1998), 9 (1999), 10 (2000), 22 (2001), 23 (2002), 12 (2004), 19 (2005), 15 (2006), 8 (2007)

=== Other motocross / supercross ===
- 2000 Motocross des Nations Champion (Team USA)
- 2001 U.S. Open of Supercross Champion
- 2005 FIM SX1 World Supercross Champion
- 2005 Motocross des Nations Champion (Team USA)
- 2005 U.S. Open of Supercross Champion
- 2007 Motocross of Nations Champion (Team USA)

=== NASCAR ===
(key) (Bold – Pole position awarded by qualifying time. Italics – Pole position earned by points standings or practice time. * – Most laps led.)

==== Nationwide Series ====
NASCAR Nationwide Series results
Year	Team	No.	Make	1	2	3	4	5	6	7	8	9	10	11	12	13	14	15	16	17	18	19	20	21	22	23	24	25	26	27	28	29	30	31	32	33	34	35	NNSC	Pts	Ref
2010	Turner Motorsports	10	Toyota	DAY	CAL	LVS	BRI	NSH	PHO	TEX	TAL	RCH	DAR	DOV	CLT	NSH	KEN	ROA	NHA	DAY	CHI	GTY	IRP	IOW	GLN	MCH	BRI	CGV	ATL	RCH	DOV	KAN; 18	CAL; 31	CLT	GTY	TEX; 35	PHO; 21	HOM	84th	337	
2011	Turner Motorsports	30	Chevy	DAY	PHO	LVS	BRI	CAL	TEX	TAL	NSH	RCH	DAR	DOV	IOW	CLT	CHI	MCH	ROA; 9	DAY; 39	KEN	NHA	NSH	IRP	IOW	GLN	CGV	BRI	ATL	RCH; 26	CHI	DOV	KAN	CLT	TEX				113th	0^{1}	
2011	Turner Motorsports	34	Chevy																																	PHO; 15	HOM		113th	0^{1}	

==== Camping World Truck Series ====
NASCAR Camping World Truck Series results
Year	Team	No.	Make	1	2	3	4	5	6	7	8	9	10	11	12	13	14	15	16	17	18	19	20	21	22	23	24	25	NCWTC	Pts	Ref
2009	Kevin Harvick Incorporated	4	Chevy	DAY; 24	CAL; 8	ATL; 21	MAR; 29	KAN; 23	CLT	DOV	TEX; 11	MCH; 7	MLW; 19	MEM; 14	KEN; 7	IRP; 19	NSH	BRI	CHI; 18	IOW; 13	GTW; 22	NHA	LVS; 22	MAR	TAL; 20	TEX; 12			22nd	1978	
2009	Turner Motorsports	31	Chevy																								PHO; 18	HOM; 19	22nd	1978	
2010	Turner Motorsports	4	Chevy	DAY; 29	ATL; 6	MAR; 10	NSH; 15	KAN; 12	DOV; 4	CLT; 14	TEX; 20	MCH; 15	IOW; 9	GTY; 29	IRP; 14	POC; 19	NSH; 14	DAR; 24	BRI; 19	CHI; 28	KEN; 5	NHA; 29	LVS; 9	MAR; 9	TAL; 5	TEX; 10	PHO; 27	HOM; 21	13th	2925	
2011	Turner Motorsports	4	Chevy	DAY; 8	PHO; 31	DAR; 30	MAR; 8	NSH; 14	DOV; 29	CLT; 12	KAN; 21	TEX; 6	KEN; 13	IOW; 27	NSH; 16	IRP; 19	POC; 20	MCH; 12	BRI; 29	**ATL**; 8	CHI; 25	NHA; 19	KEN; 6	LVS; 12	TAL; 4	MAR; 35	TEX; 8	HOM; 17	16th	675	

==== Camping World East Series ====
NASCAR Camping World East Series results
Year	Team	No.	Make	1	2	3	4	5	6	7	8	9	10	11	12	13	NCWEC	Pts	Ref
2008	Ken Schrader Racing	4	Chevy	GRE; 5	IOW; 14	**SBO**; 26	GLN; 9	NHA; 5	TMP; 17	MCM; 4	ADI; 6		MFD; 8	NHA; 16	DOV; 7	STA; 10	6th	1745	
2008	Ken Schrader Racing	4	Dodge									LRP; 12					6th	1745	

=== ARCA Racing Series ===
(key) (Bold – Pole position awarded by qualifying time. Italics – Pole position earned by points standings or practice time. * – Most laps led.)

ARCA Racing Series results
Year	Team	No.	Make	1	2	3	4	5	6	7	8	9	10	11	12	13	14	15	16	17	18	19	20	21	ARSC	Pts	Ref
2008	Kevin Harvick Incorporated	33	Chevy	DAY	SLM	IOW	KAN	CAR	KEN	TOL	POC	MCH	CAY	KEN	BLN	POC	NSH	ISF	DSF	CHI	SLM	NJE	TAL; 30	TOL	139th	80	
2009	Kevin Harvick Incorporated	33	Chevy	DAY; 21	SLM	CAR; 17	TAL	KEN	TOL	POC	MCH	MFD	IOW	KEN	BLN	POC	ISF	CHI	TOL	DSF	NJE	SLM	KAN	CAR	85th	270	
2010	Turner Motorsports	4	Toyota	DAY; 7	PBE	SLM	TEX; 25	TAL; 31	TOL	POC	MCH	IOW	MFD	POC	BLN	NJE	ISF	CHI	DSF	TOL	SLM	KAN	CAR		60th	375	
2011	Turner Motorsports	4	Chevy	DAY; 4	TAL	SLM	TOL	NJE	CHI	POC	MCH	WIN	BLN	IOW	IRP	POC	ISF	MAD	DSF	SLM	KAN	TOL			88th	210	

=== X Games competition history ===
GOLD (3) SILVER (0) BRONZE (2)
Year	X Games	Events	Rank	Medal
2007	Summer X Games XIII	Moto X Racing	1st	Gold medal
2008	Summer X Games XIV	Moto X Step Up	1st	Gold medal
2009	Summer X Games XV	Moto X Best Whip	3rd	Bronze medal
2009	Summer X Games XV	Moto X Step Up	1st	Gold medal
2019	Example World of X Real Moto 2019	MTX Real Moto	3rd	Bronze medal
