= 2014 in Brazil =

Events in the year 2014 in Brazil.

== Incumbents ==
=== Federal government ===
- President: Dilma Rousseff
- Vice President: Michel Temer

=== Governors ===
- Acre: Tião Viana
- Alagoas: Teotônio Vilela Filho
- Amapá: Camilo Capiberibe
- Amazonas:
  - Omar Aziz (until 4 April)
  - José Melo (from 4 April)
- Bahia: Jaques Wagner
- Ceará: Cid Gomes
- Espírito Santo: Renato Casagrande
- Goiás: Marconi Perillo
- Maranhão:
  - Roseana Sarney (until 10 December)
  - Arnaldo Melo (from 10 December)
- Mato Grosso: Silval da Cunha
- Mato Grosso do Sul: André Puccinelli
- Minas Gerais:
  - Antônio Anastasia (until 4 April)
  - Alberto Pinto Coelho (from 4 April)
- Pará: Ricardo Coutinho
- Paraíba: Simão Jatene
- Paraná: Beto Richa
- Pernambuco:
  - Eduardo Campos (until 3 April)
  - João Lyra Neto (from 3 April)
- Piauí:
  - Wilson Martins (until 4 April)
  - Ze Filho (from 4 April)
- Rio de Janeiro:
  - Sérgio Cabral Filho (until 3 April)
  - Luiz Fernando Pezão (from 3 April)
- Rio Grande do Norte: Rosalba Ciarlini Rosado
- Rio Grande do Sul: Tarso Genro
- Rondônia: Confúcio Moura
- Roraima:
  - José de Anchieta Júnior (until 4 April)
  - Chico Rodrigues (4 April-1 December)
- Santa Catarina: Raimundo Colombo
- São Paulo: Geraldo Alckmin
- Sergipe: Jackson Barreto
- Tocantins:
  - José Wilson Siqueira Campos (until 9 May)
  - Sandoval Cardoso (from 9 May)

=== Vice governors ===
- Acre: Carlos César Correia de Messias
- Alagoas: José Thomaz da Silva Nonô Neto
- Amapá: Doralice Nascimento de Souza
- Amazonas: José Melo de Oliveira
- Bahia: Otto Alencar
- Ceará: Domingos Gomes de Aguiar Filho
- Espírito Santo: Givaldo Vieira da Silva
- Goiás: José Eliton de Figueiredo Júnior
- Maranhão: Joaquim Washington Luiz de Oliveira
- Mato Grosso: Francisco Tarquínio Daltro
- Mato Grosso do Sul: Simone Tebet
- Minas Gerais: Alberto Pinto Coelho Júnior
- Pará: Helenilson Cunha Pontes
- Paraíba: Rômulo José de Gouveia
- Paraná: Flávio José Arns
- Pernambuco: João Soares Lyra Neto
- Piaui: Antônio José de Moraes Souza Filho
- Rio de Janeiro:
  - Luiz Fernando Pezão (until 3 April)
  - Vacant thereafter (starting 3 April)
- Rio Grande do Norte: Robinson Faria
- Rio Grande do Sul: Jorge Alberto Duarte Grill
- Rondônia: Airton Pedro Gurgacz
- Roraima: Francisco de Assis Rodrigues
- Santa Catarina: Eduardo Pinho Moreira
- São Paulo: Guilherme Afif Domingos
- Sergipe: Jackson Barreto de Lima
- Tocantins:
  - João Oliveira de Sousa (until 3 April)
  - Vacant thereafter

== Events ==
- 2014 protests in Brazil

=== January ===
- 7 January: Folha de São Paulo publishes video footage showing the decapitated remains of three inmates killed at the Pedrinhas Prison Complex in Maranhão, in order to highlight severe prison violence.
- 29 January: The Clean Company Act, establishing administrative and civil liability of companies for acts of corruption against national or foreign public administrations, enters into force.

=== April ===
- The government enacts the Brazilian Digital Bill of Rights, protecting privacy, free expression online, and net neutrality.
- The National Council of Justice issues a recommendation to courts to strengthen investigations of torture and ill-treatment in detention facilities.

=== May ===
- Nearly 2,900 police officers and public servants in Rio de Janeiro receive financial compensation for meeting crime reduction targets, including lowering police killings.

=== June ===
- 5 June: The European Centre for Disease Prevention and Control (ECDC) releases a risk assessment on communicable diseases and health threats for European citizens attending the 2014 FIFA World Cup.
- Brazil votes in favor of a UN Human Rights Council resolution condemning Israeli military operations in Gaza and abuses against civilians by both sides.

=== July ===
- 3 July: An overpass collapses onto a busy carriageway in Belo Horizonte, killing two people and leaving 22 injured.
- 14-16 July: 6th BRICS summit.

=== August ===
- 13 August: A Cessna aircraft crashes in the residential area of Santos, killing seven people, including Pernambuco Governor Eduardo Campos; a candidate in the upcoming Brazilian presidential election. It would also spark a large fire.
- 19 August: After escaping in 2011, former doctor Roger Abdelmassih, 70 years old, is captured by the Paraguayan police with the support of the Brazilian Federal Police in Asunción.

=== September ===
- 14 September: Eike Batista is charged with insider trading and manipulating the stock price of OGX.
- 27 September: Miss Brazil 2014.

=== October ===
- 5 October: The first round of general elections in the country is held. Dilma Rousseff and Aécio Neves move into the second round of the presidential election.
- 18 October: Eike Batista's insider trading trial begins.
- 19 October: Brazilian NGO Imazon releases figures that show deforestation in the Amazon has surged 190% over the same month in 2013, a year which itself showed a 29% increase in deforestation.
- 26 October: The second round of general elections in the country is held, with Dilma Rousseff winning re-election by a narrow margin, 51.6% to Neves' 48.4%.

=== November ===
- Brazil votes in favor of a UN General Assembly resolution calling for the Security Council to refer North Korea to the International Criminal Court for crimes against humanity.

=== December ===
- 10 December: 26 year old Sailson José das Graças is arrested for the serial murder as many as 41 people in a string of suspected racist hate crimes.

== Arts and culture ==
For Brazilian films first released in 2014, see the list of Brazilian films of 2014. In music, see the list of number-one pop hits of 2014 (Brazil) and the list of Hot 100 number-one singles of 2014 (Brazil).

Alberto da Costa e Silva won the Camões Prize.

== Sports ==
Brazil hosted the 2014 FIFA World Cup, 2014 Men's South American Volleyball Club Championship, the 2014 Women's South American Volleyball Club Championship and the 2014 FIVB Volleyball Men's Club World Championship.

In international multi-sport events, Brazil participated in the Winter Olympics, in the Winter Paralympics and also in the 2014 Summer Youth Olympics.

For events in football (soccer), see 2014 in Brazilian football.

For motorsport, see 2014 Campeonato Brasileiro de Turismo season, 2014 Desafio Internacional das Estrelas, 2014 Fórmula 3 Brasil season, 2014 Formula 3 Brazil Open, 2014 Fórmula Truck season, 2014 Brasileiro de Marcas season and 2014 Stock Car Brasil season.

Other sport events include the 2014 Brasil Open and the UFC Fight Night: Machida vs. Mousasi.

== Deaths ==
=== January ===
- January 5: Nelson Ned, 66, singer, pneumonia.
- January 10: Marly Marley, 75, vedette and actress, pancreatic cancer.

=== February ===
- February 2: Eduardo Coutinho, 80, film director, stabbed.
- February 8: Maicon Pereira de Oliveira, 25, footballer, traffic collision.
- February 22: Arduíno Colassanti, 78, Italian-born Brazilian actor.

=== March ===
- March 6: Sérgio Guerra, 66, economist and politician, member of the Federal Senate (2003–2011).
- March 13: Paulo Goulart, 81, actor, cancer.
- March 20: Hilderaldo Bellini, 83, footballer, two-time World Cup winner (1958, 1962), complications from a heart attack.
- March 24: Paulo Schroeber, 40, guitarist (Almah), heart failure.

=== April ===
- April 3: Pedro Fré, 89, Roman Catholic prelate, Bishop of Corumbá (1985–1989) and Barretos (1989–2000).
- April 5: José Wilker, 66, actor (Medicine Man) and director, heart attack.
- April 12: Maurício Alves Peruchi, 24, footballer, traffic collision.
- April 17: Henry Maksoud, 85, businessman, cardiac arrest.
- April 19: Luciano do Valle, 66, sports commentator.
- April 25: Paulo Malhães, 76-77, soldier.
- April 26:
  - José Moreira Bastos Neto, 61, Roman Catholic prelate, Bishop of Três Lagoas (since 2009), heart attack.
  - Aloísio Roque Oppermann, 77, Roman Catholic prelate, Archbishop of Uberaba (1996–2012). (body discovered on this date)

=== May ===
- May 2: Tomás Balduino, 91, Roman Catholic prelate, Bishop of Goiás (1967–1998).
- May 8:
  - Homero Leite Meira, 82, Roman Catholic prelate, Bishop of Itabuna (1978–1980) and Irecê (1980–1983).
  - Jair Rodrigues, 75, musician and singer, heart attack.
- May 10: Yeso Amalfi, 88, footballer (Olympique de Marseille).
- May 11: Celso Pereira de Almeida, 86, Roman Catholic prelate, Bishop of Porto Nacional (1976–1995) and Itumbiara (1995–1998).
- May 13: Altamiro Rossato, 88, Roman Catholic prelate, Bishop of Marabá (1985–1989), Archbishop of Porto Alegre (1991–2001).
- May 21: João Filgueiras Lima, 82, architect, prostate cancer.
- May 23: Joel Camargo, 67, footballer (Santos), renal failure.
- May 25: Washington César Santos, 54, footballer (national team), amyotrophic lateral sclerosis.
- May 28: Ciro de Quadros, 74, physician, cancer.
- May 31: Marinho Chagas, 62, footballer (Botafogo, national team), gastrointestinal bleeding.

=== June ===
- June 7:
  - Fernandão, 36, footballer (Sport Club Internacional, national team), helicopter crash.
  - Helcio Milito, 83, musician.
- June 10:
  - Marcello Alencar, 88, politician and lawyer, Governor of Rio de Janeiro (1995–1999), Mayor of Rio de Janeiro (1983–1986, 1989–1993).
  - Vital João Geraldo Wilderink, 82, Dutch-born Brazilian Roman Catholic prelate, Bishop of Itaguaí (1980–1998).
- June 14: Alex Chandre de Oliveira, 36, footballer (Hangzhou Greentown), heart attack.
- June 15: Moise Safra, 79, Syrian-born Brazilian billionaire financier, founder and chairman of Banco Safra, Parkinson's disease.
- June 18: Márcio Moreira, 67, advertising executive.
- June 20: Oberdan Cattani, 95, footballer (Sociedade Esportiva Palmeiras).
- June 21:
  - Rose Marie Muraro, 83, sociologist.
  - Irajá Damiani Pinto, 94, paleontologist.
- June 26: Moacyr José Vitti, 73, Roman Catholic prelate, Archbishop of Curitiba (since 2004), heart attack.
- June 27: Amaro Macedo, 100, botanist and plant collector.

=== July ===
- July 6: Benedito de Assis da Silva, 61, footballer (Fluminense), multiple organ failure.
- July 7: Estanislau Amadeu Kreutz, 86, Roman Catholic prelate, Bishop of Santo Ângelo (1973–2004), multiple organ failure.
- July 8: Plínio de Arruda Sampaio, 83, jurist and politician, bone cancer.
- July 9: Luiz Alberto Dias Menezes, 63, geologist and mineral dealer.
- July 14: Vange Leonel, 51, singer, writer, feminist and LGBT activist, ovarian cancer.
- July 18: João Ubaldo Ribeiro, 73, writer, pulmonary embolism.
- July 19:
  - Rubem Alves, 80, writer, philosopher and theologian, multiple organ failure due to pneumonia.
  - Norberto Odebrecht, 93, engineer, founder of Odebrecht and the Odebrecht Foundation, cardiac complications.
- July 23: Ariano Suassuna, 87, writer, cardiac arrest as a complication from a stroke.
- July 25: Ronaldo Rogério de Freitas Mourão, 79, astronomer.
- July 26: Spiridon Mattar, 93, Lebanese-born Brazilian Melkite Catholic hierarch, Bishop of Nossa Senhora do Paraíso em São Paulo (1978–1990).
- July 30: Fausto Fanti, 35, humorist (Hermes & Renato) and guitarist (Massacration), suicide by hanging.

=== August ===
- August 3: Benedito de Ulhôa Vieira, 93, Roman Catholic prelate, Archbishop of Uberaba (1978–1996).
- August 11: Djalma Cavalcante, 57, football player and coach, heart attack.
- August 11: Armando Círio, 98, Italian-born Brazilian Roman Catholic prelate, Archbishop of Cascavel (1978–1995).
- August 13: Eduardo Campos, 49, politician, Minister of Science and Technology (2004–2005), Governor of Pernambuco (2007–2014), 2014 presidential candidate, plane crash.
- August 24: Antônio Ermírio de Moraes, 86, businessman, CEO of the Votorantim Group, heart failure.

=== September ===
- September 1: Sérgio Rodrigues, 86, architect and designer.
- September 11: Jerônimo Garcia de Santana, 79, politician, Governor of Rondônia (1987–1991), Mayor of Porto Velho (1986).
- September 13: Iberê Ferreira, 70, politician, Governor of Rio Grande do Norte (2010–2011).
- September 14: Servílio Conti, 97, Italian-born Brazilian Roman Catholic prelate, Bishop of Roraima (1965–1975).
- September 30: Jadir Ambrósio, 91, musician and composer.

=== October ===
- October 3: Lori Sandri, 65, football manager, brain tumor.
- October 4: Hugo Carvana, 77, actor (Entranced Earth, Antonio das Mortes) and director (Casa da Mãe Joana).
- October 15: João Corso, 86, Roman Catholic prelate, Bishop of Campos (1990–1995).

=== November ===
- November 1:
  - Edson Décimo Alves Araújo, 27, footballer (Atlético-PR), shot.
  - Alberto Johannes Först, 87, German-born Brazilian Roman Catholic prelate, Bishop of Dourados (1990–2001).
- November 11: Caetano Lima dos Santos, 98, bishop of the Roman Catholic Church.
- November 13: Manoel de Barros, 97, poet.
- November 14: Adib Jatene, 85, cardiologist and politician, Minister of Health (1992, 1995–1996), heart attack.
- November 20:
  - Márcio Thomaz Bastos, 79, politician, Minister of Justice (2003–2007), lung failure.
  - Samuel Klein, 91, Polish-born Brazilian magnate (Casas Bahia).

=== December ===
- December 3: Alfredo Ernest Novak, 84, American-born Brazilian Roman Catholic prelate, Bishop of Paranaguá (1989–2006).
- December 9: José Feghali, 53, pianist, suicide by gunshot.
- December 23: João Nílson Zunino, 68, executive, President of Avaí FC (2002–2013).

== See also ==
- 2014 in Brazilian football
