= 2009 FIM Motocross World Championship =

Motocross championship season

2009 Motocross World Championship

Seasons
- ← 2008 2010 →

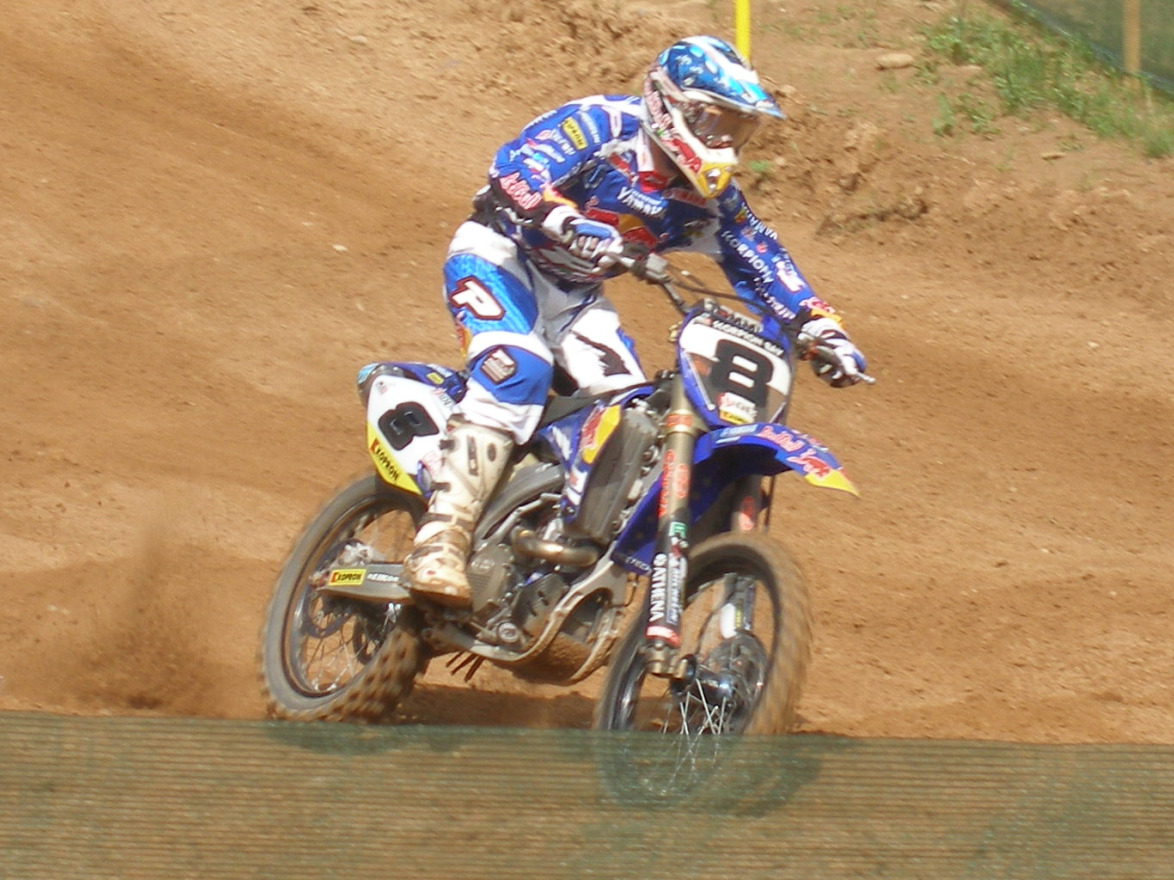

The 2009 FIM Motocross World Championship was the 53rd F.I.M. Motocross Racing World Championship season. Antonio Cairoli won the MX1 title for Yamaha, Marvin Musquin claimed the MX2 title for KTM and Pierre Renet triumphed in MX3 for Honda.

== Overview ==
The 2009 season started on 29 March in Faenza, Italy and finished on 13 September in Canelinha, Brazil. The fifteen races of the season were held in fourteen countries, Italy, Bulgaria, Turkey, Nederlands (2x), Portugal, Spain, Great Britain, France, Germany, Latvia, Sweden, Belgium, Czech Republic and Brazil.

== Grands Prix ==
Round	Date	Grand Prix	Location	Race 1 Winner	Race 2 Winner	Round Winner
MX1
1	March 29	Italy	Faenza	(Estonia) Tanel Leok	Race cancelled	(Estonia) Tanel Leok
2	April 5	Bulgaria	Sevlievo	(Belgium) Ken De Dycker	(Spain) Jonathan Barragan	(New Zealand) Joshua Coppins
3	April 12	Turkey	Istanbul	(Italy) Antonio Cairoli	(Italy) Antonio Cairoli	(Italy) Antonio Cairoli
4	April 26	Benelux	Valkenswaard	(Italy) Antonio Cairoli	(Spain) Jonathan Barragan	(Spain) Jonathan Barragan
5	May 10	Portugal	Águeda	(Italy) Antonio Cairoli	(Italy) Antonio Cairoli	(Italy) Antonio Cairoli
6	May 17	Catalonia	Bellpuig	(Spain) Jonathan Barragan	(Italy) Antonio Cairoli	(Spain) Jonathan Barragan
7	May 31	United Kingdom	Mallory Park	(Italy) David Philippaerts	(Germany) Maximilian Nagl	(Italy) David Philippaerts
8	June 7	France	Ernée	(Germany) Maximilian Nagl	(Germany) Maximilian Nagl	(Germany) Maximilian Nagl
9	June 21	Germany	Teutschenthal	(Germany) Maximilian Nagl	(Italy) Antonio Cairoli	(Italy) Antonio Cairoli
10	June 28	Latvia	Ķegums	(Belgium) Clément Desalle	(Italy) Antonio Cairoli	(Italy) Antonio Cairoli
11	July 5	Sweden	Uddevalla	(Germany) Maximilian Nagl	(Italy) Antonio Cairoli	(Germany) Maximilian Nagl
12	August 2	Belgium	Lommel	(Belgium) Ken De Dycker	(Germany) Maximilian Nagl	(Belgium) Ken De Dycker
13	August 9	Czech Republic	Loket	(Germany) Maximilian Nagl	(Belgium) Clément Desalle	(Belgium) Clément Desalle
14	August 30	Netherlands	Lierop	(Belgium) Ken De Dycker	(Belgium) Ken De Dycker	(Belgium) Ken De Dycker
15	September 13	Brazil	Canelinha	(Belgium) Clément Desalle	(Belgium) Steve Ramon	(Belgium) Clément Desalle
MX2
1	March 29	Italy	Faenza	(France) Gautier Paulin	(France) Gautier Paulin	(France) Gautier Paulin
2	April 5	Bulgaria	Sevlievo	(France) Marvin Musquin	(France) Steven Frossard	(France) Marvin Musquin
3	April 12	Turkey	Istanbul	(France) Gautier Paulin	(United States) Zach Osborne	(United States) Zach Osborne
4	April 26	Benelux	Valkenswaard	(United Kingdom) Shaun Simpson	(Portugal) Rui Gonçalves	(Portugal) Rui Gonçalves
5	May 10	Portugal	Águeda	(France) Marvin Musquin	(Portugal) Rui Gonçalves	(Portugal) Rui Gonçalves
6	May 17	Catalonia	Bellpuig	(Portugal) Rui Gonçalves	(France) Anthony Boissiere	(Belgium) Jeremy van Horebeek
7	May 31	United Kingdom	Mallory Park	(France) Marvin Musquin	(France) Marvin Musquin	(France) Marvin Musquin
8	June 7	France	Ernée	(France) Marvin Musquin	(France) Marvin Musquin	(France) Marvin Musquin
9	June 21	Germany	Teutschenthal	(France) Steven Frossard	(France) Marvin Musquin	(Germany) Ken Roczen
10	June 28	Latvia	Ķegums	(France) Marvin Musquin	(Portugal) Rui Gonçalves	(Portugal) Rui Gonçalves
11	July 5	Sweden	Uddevalla	(Germany) Ken Roczen	(Portugal) Rui Gonçalves	(Portugal) Rui Gonçalves
12	August 2	Belgium	Lommel	(France) Marvin Musquin	(France) Marvin Musquin	(France) Marvin Musquin
13	August 9	Czech Republic	Loket	(Germany) Ken Roczen	(France) Gautier Paulin	(France) Gautier Paulin
14	August 30	Netherlands	Lierop	(Portugal) Rui Gonçalves	(France) Marvin Musquin	(France) Marvin Musquin
15	September 13	Brazil	Canelinha	(France) Marvin Musquin	(France) Marvin Musquin	(France) Marvin Musquin
MX3
1	April 12	United Kingdom	Hawkstone Park	(Belgium) Sven Breugelmans	(France) Julien Vanni	(France) Julien Vanni
2	April 19	Spain	Talavera de la Reina	(France) Julien Vanni	(Spain) Alvaro Lozano	(France) Julien Vanni
3	May 3	Portugal	Cortelha	(France) Pierre Renet	(Italy) Alex Salvini	(France) Pierre Renet
4	May 24	Chile	Laguna Caren	(Italy) Alex Salvini	(Finland) Antti Pyrhönen	(Italy) Alex Salvini
5	June 7	Czech Republic	Holice	(Czech Republic) Martin Žerava	(France) Julien Vanni	(France) Julien Vanni
6	June 14	Bulgaria	Troyan	(France) Julien Vanni	(Italy) Alex Salvini	(France) Julien Vanni
7	June 21	Netherlands	Markelo	(United Kingdom) Brad Anderson	(United Kingdom) Brad Anderson	(United Kingdom) Brad Anderson
8	July 5	Italy	Faenza	(France) Pierre Renet	(Italy) Alex Salvini	(France) Pierre Renet
9	July 12	Slovenia	Orehova Vas	(France) Pierre Renet	(Finland) Antti Pyrhönen	(France) Pierre Renet
10	July 19	Croatia	Mladina	(Slovenia) Matevz Irt	(Slovenia) Matevz Irt	(Slovenia) Matevz Irt
11	August 2	Germany	Schwedt	(Italy) Alex Salvini	(Italy) Alex Salvini	(Italy) Alex Salvini
12	August 9	France	Lacapelle-Marival	(France) Pierre Renet	(France) Pierre Renet	(France) Pierre Renet
13	August 23	Finland	Vantaa	(Finland) Antti Pyrhönen	(Finland) Antti Pyrhönen	(Finland) Antti Pyrhönen
14	August 30	Denmark	Randers	(France) Julien Vanni	(France) Pierre Renet	(France) Pierre Renet
15	September 13	France	Villars-sous-Écot	(France) Xavier Boog	(France) Xavier Boog	(France) Xavier Boog

== Standings ==
=== Scoring system ===
Points are awarded to the top twenty finishers.

Position	1st	2nd	3rd	4th	5th	6th	7th	8th	9th	10th	11th	12th	13th	14th	15th	16th	17th	18th	19th	20th
Points	25	22	20	18	16	15	14	13	12	11	10	9	8	7	6	5	4	3	2	1

=== Riders' standings ===
==== MX1 ====
Pos	Rider	Bike	ITA (Italy)		BUL (Bulgaria)		TUR (Turkey)		BEN (Benelux)		POR (Portugal)		CAT (Catalonia)		GBR (United Kingdom)		FRA (France)		GER (Germany)		LAT (Latvia)		SWE (Sweden)		BEL (Belgium)		CZE (Czech Republic)		NED (Netherlands)		BRA (Brazil)		Pts
1	(Italy) Cairoli	Yamaha	5	C	7	4	1	1	1	3	1	1	8	1	10	8	7	2	2	1	2	1	4	1	5	2	6	2	5	4	6	12	561
2	(Germany) Nagl	KTM	7	C	3	5	6	13	11	17	4	7	7	2	4	1	1	1	1	3	3	6	1	2	6	1	1	4	8	5	2	5	525
3	(Belgium) Desalle	Honda	3	C	10	15	9	9	9	8	3	3	2	7	2	3	4	6	5	6	1	5	3	8	2	9	2	1	6	3	1	2	508
4	(Italy) Philippaerts	Yamaha	9	C	5	3	4	2	6	6	5	Ret	3	3	1	2	2	4	4	4	5	7	5	3	7	10	3	3	2	8	3	7	497
5	(Belgium) De Dycker	Suzuki	2	C	1	8	5	4	4	9	2	2	Ret	6	6	11	3	Ret	7	2	7	3	2	4	1	3	8	8	1	1	4	4	495
6	(New Zealand) Coppins	Yamaha	6	C	2	2	8	8	10	5	7	4	4	8	5	4	6	7	3	5	4	2	6	7	4	7	4	5	4	2	5	3	485
7	(Estonia) T.Leok	Yamaha	1	C	6	6	19	5	5	2	6	5	9	13	8	6	8	3	6	7	Ret	4	7	6	8	6	7	15	3	6	8	Ret	395
8	(South Africa) Swanepoel	Kawasaki	13	C	Ret	10	11	16	24	12	10	8	6	11	11	17	13	15	15	17	9	12	9	9	Ret	8	5	7	10	12	9	9	262
9	(Spain) Barragan	KTM	10	C	4	1	7	6	3	1	8	10	1	4	3	Ret	INJ	INJ	INJ	INJ	INJ	INJ	INJ	INJ	INJ	INJ	INJ	INJ	Ret	7	Ret	Ret	229
10	(Belgium) Ramon	Suzuki	12	C	8	7	2	3	13	7	INJ	INJ	INJ	INJ	INJ	INJ	INJ	INJ	INJ	INJ	INJ	INJ	INJ	INJ	3	4	Ret	6	7	10	7	1	217
11	(Belgium) Priem	Aprilia	Ret	C	13	14	13	Ret	Ret	Ret	13	13	Ret	12	18	15	11	11	11	13	11	9	11	16	10	5	10	13	9	16	Ret	DNS	195
12	(Estonia) A.Leok	TM	4	C	DNS	16	16	17	16	10	12	11	10	14	13	Ret	9	8	12	9	6	8	INJ	INJ	INJ	INJ	INJ	INJ	12	9			188
13	(France) Vuillemin	Kawasaki	19	C	11	11	10	14	Ret	13	11	6	5	9			12	14	8	14	Ret	DNS	Ret	8					Ret	DNS	Ret	8	163
14	(France) Aranda	Kawasaki	Ret	C	16	Ret	Ret	11	Ret	Ret	9	9	Ret	10	9	9	15	Ret	10	Ret	8	Ret	8	Ret	19	21	9	9	21	22			143
15	(United Kingdom) Church	CCM	8	C	19	Ret			22	Ret	15	Ret	14	17	Ret	21	10	13	13	15	12	17	18	13	Ret	Ret	14	12	15	15	12	13	134
16	(Spain) Campano	Yamaha	Ret	C	Ret	Ret	18	21	Ret	Ret	20	12	13	Ret	16	13	Ret	19	21	16	10	10	12	Ret	14	19	12	11	19	Ret	11	6	127
17	(Switzerland) Bill	Aprilia	15	C	Ret	17	15	15	Ret	Ret	Ret	Ret	12	Ret	Ret	Ret	14	12	17	10	Ret	Ret	13	10	18	17	11	Ret	Ret	DNS	15	10	115
18	(United Kingdom) Bi.MacKenzie	Honda	Ret	C	Ret	9	12	20	8	14	Ret	11	5	Ret	5	18	5	22											17	Ret			107
19	(Belgium) Strijbos	Honda	17	C	9	Ret	3	7	7	4															9	Ret							94
20	(United Kingdom) Dougan	CCM	11	C	20	Ret	20	Ret	19	18	DNS	Ret	15	23	15	Ret	23	10	18	Ret	Ret	11	16	11	22	12	13	Ret	Ret	23	13	Ret	93
21	(France) Pichon	Honda													7	7	5	9	9	8													81
22	(South Africa) Terreblanche	Kawasaki	Ret	C	17	22			Ret	Ret	16	Ret	16	18	Ret	16	19	17	Ret	18	15	Ret	14	17	15	13	16	16	20	19			75
23	(Estonia) Krestinov	KTM	Ret	C	18	18	Ret	19	17	11	21	18	Ret	15	17	20	16	16	20	DNS					13	Ret	21	18	14	18			68
24	(Netherlands) de Reuver	Honda	14	C	12	Ret	14	22	2	Ret																			Ret	11	14	Ret	62
25	(France) Leonce	Aprilia	Ret	C	DNS	23	21	Ret	21	Ret	19	16	Ret	Ret	24	19	Ret	Ret	16	11	17	15	15	12	21	Ret	20	10					61
26	(Netherlands) van Vijfeijken	Yamaha	Ret	C	22	19	Ret	23	18	15	22	20	20	22	25	25	17	20	24	20	18	16	20	20	Ret	15	22	19	13	13			53
27	(United Kingdom) Noble	Suzuki	18	C	14	13	22	12	14	16																							39
28	(United Kingdom) Br.Mackenzie	Honda													19	22	21	18	19	Ret	Ret	13	10	14	Ret	Ret	Ret	17					37
29	(Czech Republic) Neugebauer	Kawasaki	Ret	C			17	18					20	14			Ret	Ret									15	14					28
30	(France) Pourcel	Kawasaki	Ret	C	15	12	Ret	10																									26
31	(United Kingdom) Anderson	Honda							15	Ret			12	12																			24
32	(Belgium) Melotte	Honda	20	C					12	DNS															Ret	11	19	Ret					22
33	(France) Potisek	Honda																							11	Ret			16	14			22
34	(Brazil) Balbi Jr	Honda																													10	11	21
35	(Sweden) Söderström	Kawasaki																					17	15					11	Ret			20
36	(Latvia) Steinbergs	Honda	Ret	C	23	Ret	25	24	Ret	22	23	21	17	Ret	22	24	22	21	23	19	14	18	23	19	20	Ret	24	23	23	21			19
37	(United Kingdom) Nunn	Suzuki													14	10																	18
38	(France) Izoird	Suzuki									14	15	Ret	16																			18
39	(Sweden) Carlsson	Suzuki	Ret	C	24	21	23	Ret	Ret	19	24	19	18	19					Ret	Ret	13	Ret	22	Ret									17
40	(Portugal) Correira	Suzuki									17	14	19	20																			14
41	(Belgium) Martens	KTM																							12	20			18	Ret			13
42	(Latvia) Freibergs	Yamaha																			16	14											12
43	(Brazil) Garcia	Honda																													17	14	11
44	(Belgium) Van Nooten	KTM																							16	16							10
45	(Hungary) Németh	KTM																	Ret	12													9
46	(Brazil) Da Silva Faria	KTM																													18	15	9
47	(Belgium) Salaets	Aprilia																							Ret	14			Ret	20			8
48	(Belgium) Wouts	Honda	16	C	21	20	24	Ret	20	20			Ret	21																			8
49	(Italy) Bonini	KTM																							17	Ret	Ret	DNS	Ret	17			8
50	(France) Richier	Kawasaki															Ret	DNS	14	Ret	Ret	Ret					Ret	Ret					7
51	(Brazil) Zenni	Suzuki																													19	16	7
52	(Brazil) Silva jr	Kawasaki																													16	Ret	5
53	(Czech Republic) Kadleček	TM													Ret	26											17	20					5
54	(Argentina) Guiral	Suzuki																													21	17	4
55	(Portugal) Santos	Aprilia									Ret	17																					4
56	(Latvia) Livs	Yamaha																			19	19											4
57	(Sweden) Lindström	KTM																					21	18									3
58	(Netherlands) Reynders	Suzuki																							Ret	18			22	Ret			3
59	(Chile) Baranao	Yamaha																													22	18	3
60	(United Kingdom) Rose	Honda													23	18																	3
61	(France) Thain	TM																									18	Ret					3
62	(Portugal) Basaula	Aprilia									18	Ret																					3
63	(Sweden) Norlen	Suzuki																					19	Ret									2
64	(Argentina) Arco	Yamaha																													Ret	19	2
65	(Latvia) Kempelis	Honda	Ret	C	Ret	24	26	Ret	25	21			21	24			Ret	Ret	27	22	20	20	25	21									2
66	(Brazil) Silva	Honda																													20	Ret	1
67	(Brazil) Balbi	Honda																													24	20	1
68	(France) Beaudouin	Honda															20	Ret															1
69	(Republic of Ireland) Edmonds	TM																									23	21					0
70	(France) Demeure	KTM																	25	21													0
71	(Latvia) Alexandrovics	Kawasaki																			Ret	21											0
72	(United Kingdom) Whatley	Kawasaki													21	DNS																	0
73	(South Africa) Branch	Honda																							23	22							0
74	(Sweden) Dahlgren	Honda																					24	22									0
75	(Austria) Schmidinger	Suzuki																									Ret	22					0
76	(France) Sallefrangue	Honda															24	23															0
77	(United Kingdom) Coutts	Yamaha													27	23																	0
78	(Poland) Kurowski	Yamaha																	28	23													0
79	(Brazil) Freitas Assunção jr	Suzuki																													23	Ret	0
80	(Germany) Sturm	Kawasaki																	26	Ret							25	24					0
81	(Czech Republic) Michek	TM																											26	24			0
82	(United Kingdom) Rowson	CCM																											24	Ret			0
83	(Croatia) Božić	KTM																											27	25			0
84	(Czech Republic) Habrich	Suzuki																											25	DNS			0
85	(Slovenia) Fortuna	Yamaha					Ret	26																									0
86	(United Kingdom) Banks-Browne	Kawasaki													26	Ret																	0
87	(United Kingdom) Snow	KTM													Ret	27																	0
88	(United Kingdom) Coutts	Husaberg													29	28																	0
89	(New Zealand) Columb	Suzuki													Ret	Ret																	0
90	(Lithuania) Bučas	Honda																			Ret	Ret											0
91	(United States) Marshall	Suzuki																							Ret	Ret							0
92	(Brazil) Lima	Honda																													Ret	Ret	0
93	(Italy) Salvini	Husqvarna	Ret	C																													0
94	(Italy) Tiveddu	Honda	Ret	C																													0
95	(Netherlands) Eggens	Honda							Ret	DNS																							0
96	(Sweden) Akerblom	Honda																					Ret	DNS									0
97	(Czech Republic) Čepelák	Yamaha																									Ret	DNS					0
98	(Netherlands) Roos	Yamaha																											Ret	DNS			0
99	(Chile) Vásquez	Honda																													DNS	Ret	0
Pos	Rider	Bike	ITA (Italy)		BUL (Bulgaria)		TUR (Turkey)		BEN (Benelux)		POR (Portugal)		CAT (Catalonia)		GBR (United Kingdom)		FRA (France)		GER (Germany)		LAT (Latvia)		SWE (Sweden)		BEL (Belgium)		CZE (Czech Republic)		NED (Netherlands)		BRA (Brazil)		Pts

Colour	Result
Gold	Winner
Silver	Second place
Bronze	Third place
Green	Points classification
Blue	Non-points classification
Blue	Non-classified finish (NC)
Purple	Retired, not classified (Ret)
Red	Did not qualify (DNQ)
Red	Did not pre-qualify (DNPQ)
Black	Disqualified (DSQ)
White	Did not start (DNS)
White	Withdrew (WD)
White	Race cancelled (C)
Blank	Did not practice (DNP)
Blank	Did not arrive (DNA)
Blank	Excluded (EX)

**Bold** – Pole
Italics – Fastest Lap

==== MX2 ====
Pos	Rider	Bike	ITA (Italy)		BUL (Bulgaria)		TUR (Turkey)		BEN (Benelux)		POR (Portugal)		CAT (Catalonia)		GBR (United Kingdom)		FRA (France)		GER (Germany)		LAT (Latvia)		SWE (Sweden)		BEL (Belgium)		CZE (Czech Republic)		NED (Netherlands)		BRA (Brazil)		Pts
1	(France) Musquin	KTM	3	C	1	3	5	2	8	12	1	6	14	9	1	1	1	1	6	1	1	2			1	1	2	Ret	2	1	1	1	540
2	(Portugal) Gonçalves	KTM	Ret	C	12	6	Ret	14	2	1	2	1	1	5	7	2	10	12	7	4	2	1	2	1	2	8	3	3	1	3	5	5	500
3	(France) Paulin	Kawasaki	1	C	2	2	1	7	7	4	4	8	16	16	3	4	8	4	5	3	5	3	7	2	15	13	4	1	Ret	14	6	Ret	437
4	(Italy) Guarneri	Yamaha	4	C	5	5	8	6	3	8	5	3	4	7	4	10	14	3	4	10	7	4	6	3	7	9	12	14	7	21	8	4	418
5	(Germany) Roczen	Suzuki									9	4	6	2	9	8	15	2	2	2	3	5	1	7	6	6	1	9	4	2	2	2	390
6	(France) Frossard	Kawasaki	13	C	Ret	1	Ret	3	Ret	11	3	2	5	6	2	3	3	14	1	5	4	Ret	3	Ret	Ret	Ret	Ret	11	22	22	4	3	332
7	(Belgium) Roelants	KTM	5	C	9	19	24	Ret	17	6	11	19	13	23	14	16	11	9	12	17	6	6	5	4	3	2	9	7	3	5	9	6	311
8	(Italy) Monni	Yamaha	Ret	C	Ret	15	4	9	12	14	14	13	8	14	5	9	17	6	10	13	9	Ret	4	5	9	10	7	12	12	12	13	8	284
9	(France) Aubin	Yamaha	7	C	3	8	Ret	Ret	5	2	8	Ret	11	4	11	Ret	9	8	8	8	11	Ret	Ret	15	13	4	Ret	5	Ret	10			256
10	(France) Boog	Suzuki	12	C	4	4	6	8	6	15	Ret	7	3	8	10	7	13	18	3	Ret							5	2	17	7			253
11	(Belgium) Van Horebeek	KTM	2	C	Ret	Ret			24	5	Ret	12	2	3	8	5	Ret	11	14	9	Ret	11	13	DNS	4	16	15	6	Ret	4			227
12	(France) Teillet	KTM	9	C	19	12	7	Ret							25	13	6	10	Ret	Ret	16	14	17	13	16	Ret	6	4	14	11	3	9	182
13	(France) Larrieu	Yamaha	Ret	C	17	14	14	18	15	9	6	5			12	19	4	5	Ret	Ret	18	15	19	21	10	11	17	Ret	9	Ret	7	Ret	177
14	(Germany) Schiffer	KTM	16	C	14	9	21	4	19	10	Ret	10	9	10					11	7	12	8	12	9	Ret	5	Ret	DNS					172
15	(Belgium) Verbruggen	Honda	Ret	C	26	Ret			11	13	23	21	12	Ret	17	14	Ret	16	13	12	8	7	11	11	5	3	23	Ret	6	9			170
16	(Switzerland) Tonus	KTM	Ret	C	7	10	17	20	10	16	7	9	10	21	21	12	5	22	Ret	Ret	17	13	Ret	16	23	15	10	8	15	17			165
17	(United Kingdom) Nicholls	KTM	10	C	24	26	10	27	22	Ret	18	16	17	13	15	17	30	21	9	14	26	16	9	10	11	Ret	11	10	26	19	11	7	156
18	(France) Boissiere	KTM	Ret	C									7	1	6	11	2	7	Ret	6	14	Ret	Ret	14	12	12	Ret	Ret					147
19	(United Kingdom) Simpson	KTM	11	C	8	7	16	11	1	3																			Ret	6	10	10	134
20	(Russia) Bobryshev	Yamaha	21	C	16	Ret	15	10	Ret	Ret	12	14	20	29	Ret	18	12	15			10	9	14	6	Ret	DNS	21	Ret	Ret	15			108
21	(United Kingdom) Sword	KTM	17	C	Ret	Ret	9	5	18	18	13	15	23	12	13	6	Ret	28	18	Ret							8	16	24	Ret			105
22	(Latvia) Karro	Suzuki	22	C	Ret	Ret	13	13	9	20			18	Ret							13	12	8	8	18	Ret	13	15	13	18			103
23	(United States) Osborne	Yamaha	Ret	C	6	13	3	1	4	7					Ret	DNS									Ret	21	28	22	19	Ret			102
24	(France) Vongsana	Honda	Ret	C	10	21	2	12	Ret	19	Ret	DNS	Ret	11	Ret	15	25	Ret	23	Ret													60
25	(France) Soubeyras	Honda	Ret	C	Ret	20	12	22	26	29	16	Ret			22	Ret	16	20	20	18	25	20	18	19			14	18	Ret	DNS	12	11	60
26	(Italy) Lupino	Yamaha	6	C	18	11	22	19	16	22	10	11			Ret	Ret	22	Ret	25	Ret													56
27	(Denmark) Larsen	Suzuki	Ret	C	15	18	19	24	20	25	Ret	20	15	Ret	30	Ret	20	29	22	16	28	18	16	22	14	Ret			10	16			56
28	(Spain) Butrón	KTM											24	18	18	Ret	23	30	19	15	15	10							16	Ret	19	13	46
29	(Netherlands) Kras	KTM							13	17																			5	8			41
30	(Netherlands) Klein Kromhof	KTM	14	C	23	Ret	25	23	23	28	20	Ret	26	15			21	Ret	24	25	22	Ret	Ret	DNS	Ret	18	19	21	8	13			40
31	(France) Rombaut	Kawasaki	19	C	21	Ret	Ret	21	Ret	24	Ret	24	25	19	20	20	7	19	15	19	20	19	Ret	Ret	26	17	22	20	23	Ret			38
32	(Japan) Kojima	Suzuki	Ret	C	20	16	18	17	Ret	DNS	15	Ret	19	Ret	16	23	26	25	21	Ret	19	Ret	22	20	21	25	34	13	25	25			37
33	(Belgium) Triest	KTM							30	23	24	17	Ret	24	27	Ret	32	24	31	21			10	12	20	22	30	Ret	11	20			36
34	(Czech Republic) Smitka	KTM	23	C	Ret	25	23	25	25	27	17	22	22	22	Ret	29	29	17	16	11	24	23	20	18	19	20	20	19	18	23			36
35	(United Kingdom) Pocock	Yamaha							21	DNS	27	25	21	30	Ret	25	18	13	26	23	23	27	15	17	17	14	29	24	20	27			33
36	(Denmark) Jorgensen	Suzuki																							8	7							27
37	(France) Leuret	Honda	Ret	C	11	Ret	11	16	Ret	DNS					Ret	DNS	19	DNS															27
38	(Italy) Maddii	Suzuki	8	C	28	28	29	28	28	30	26	26	29	28	28	28	28	27	29	27	32	Ret	29	25	27	Ret	32	26	27	28	14	15	26
39	(South Africa) Avis	Honda	Ret	C	13	17	20	15	Ret	DNS																							19
40	(Czech Republic) Michek	TM	Ret	C	22	24	Ret	26	27	Ret	19	18	Ret	17	24	24	27	26	Ret	22	Ret	Ret	23	Ret	Ret	Ret	16	Ret					14
41	(Brazil) Zanoni	Honda																													15	14	13
42	(Brazil) Vilardi	Honda																													21	12	9
43	(Brazil) Lima	Honda																													17	17	8
44	(Netherlands) Brakke	Honda							14	21																							7
45	(Slovakia) Kohut	KTM																									18	17					7
46	(Italy) Philippaerts	Yamaha	15	C	25	27	26	Ret	29	Ret	21	23	Ret	25	26	26	24	23	30	28	29	26	25	Ret	24	Ret	25	Ret	Ret	Ret			6
47	(Venezuela) Martin	Suzuki																													25	16	5
48	(Brazil) Castro	Yamaha																													16	22	5
49	(Germany) Heidecke	Kawasaki																	17	20													5
50	(Russia) Tonkov	Suzuki																			Ret	17											4
51	(Brazil) Takahashi	Honda																													18	20	4
52	(Argentina) Felipe	Kawasaki																													28	18	3
53	(France) Tarroux	Suzuki	18	C	Ret	DNS																											3
54	(Brazil) Rodrigues	Honda																													23	19	2
55	(Latvia) Justs	KTM	Ret	C	29	29	30	Ret			Ret	27	28	27	Ret	27	31	32	Ret	26	21	21	Ret	26	22	19	26	Ret	Ret	26			2
56	(South Africa) Bradshaw	Honda													19	21																	2
57	(Brazil) Assuncao	Honda																													20	24	1
58	(France) Clermont	Honda	Ret	C	Ret	22	27	Ret			25	Ret	27	20			Ret	31	27	24	27	25	21	Ret	Ret	23	27	23	28	Ret			1
59	(Italy) Chiodi	Suzuki	20	C																													1
	(Netherlands) Coldenhoff	Suzuki																											21	24			0
	(Brazil) dos Santos	Honda																													25	21	0
	(France) Lenoir	Yamaha	Ret	C	27	23	28	Ret	Ret	26	22	Ret																					0
	(United Kingdom) Elderfield	Honda													23	22																	0
	(Latvia) Macuks	Honda																			31	22											0
	(Brazil) Gentil	Honda																													22	Ret	0
	(Argentina) Urcera	Kawasaki																													24	23	0
	(Republic of Ireland) Irwin	KTM													29	30							26	23									0
	(Sweden) Eriksson	Suzuki																					24	24			31	Ret					0
	(France) Ramette	Honda																							30	24	24	Ret					0
	(Estonia) Uusna	KTM																			30	24											0
	(Uruguay) Cerdena	Kawasaki																													27	25	0
	(Czech Republic) Špaček	Kawasaki																									33	25					0
	(South Africa) Picoto	Suzuki																							25	Ret							0
	(Belgium) Vanderstraeten	Suzuki																							28	26							0
	(Spain) Cros	Kawasaki											Ret	26																			0
	(Uruguay) Fernandez	Kawasaki																													Ret	26	0
	(Sweden) Sandberg	Honda																					28	27									0
	(Argentina) Navarro	KTM																													29	27	0
	(Norway) Nyegaard	Honda																					27	Ret									0
	(Belgium) Vandueren	KTM																							Ret	27			Ret	Ret			0
	(Portugal) N. Goncalves	Suzuki									28	28																					0
	(Belgium) Van Hove	KTM																							29	28							0
	(Sweden) Pettersson	KTM																					31	28									0
	(Germany) Schoofel	Kawasaki																	28	Ret													0
	(Norway) Gultvedt	KTM																					30	29									0
	(North Macedonia) Ilioski	Suzuki					31	29																									0
	(Mongolia) Erdenebileg	Suzuki																	Ret	29													0
	(Bulgaria) Kolev	Suzuki			Ret	30																											0
	(Spain) Martinez	Yamaha											30	Ret																			0
	(Chile) Huidobro	Honda																													30	DNS	0
	(Bulgaria) Yovchev	Kawasaki			Ret	31																											0
	(Turkey) Nurcan	KTM					32	Ret																									0
	(France) Tixier	Kawasaki															Ret	33															0
	(Thailand) Penjan	Yamaha																									35	Ret					0
	(Argentina) Graciani	Kawasaki																													Ret	Ret	0
	(Uruguay) F.Alberto	Yamaha																													Ret	Ret	0
	(Argentina) Giraldo	Kawasaki																													Ret	Ret	0
	(Portugal) P.Alberto	Suzuki									Ret	DNS																					0
	(Estonia) Magi	Yamaha																			Ret	DNS											0
	(Latvia) Ivanovs	KTM																			Ret	DNS											0
	(Norway) Gundersen	Yamaha																					Ret	DNS									0
	(Netherlands) Leijtens	KTM																											Ret	DNS			0
	(Brazil) Ramos	Honda																													Ret	DNS	0
Pos	Rider	Bike	ITA (Italy)		BUL (Bulgaria)		TUR (Turkey)		BEN (Benelux)		POR (Portugal)		CAT (Catalonia)		GBR (United Kingdom)		FRA (France)		GER (Germany)		LAT (Latvia)		SWE (Sweden)		BEL (Belgium)		CZE (Czech Republic)		NED (Netherlands)		BRA (Brazil)		Pts

Colour	Result
Gold	Winner
Silver	Second place
Bronze	Third place
Green	Points classification
Blue	Non-points classification
Blue	Non-classified finish (NC)
Purple	Retired, not classified (Ret)
Red	Did not qualify (DNQ)
Red	Did not pre-qualify (DNPQ)
Black	Disqualified (DSQ)
White	Did not start (DNS)
White	Withdrew (WD)
White	Race cancelled (C)
Blank	Did not practice (DNP)
Blank	Did not arrive (DNA)
Blank	Excluded (EX)

**Bold** – Pole
Italics – Fastest Lap

==== MX3 ====
Pos	Rider	Bike	GBR (United Kingdom)		ESP (Spain)		POR (Portugal)		CHL (Chile)		CZE (Czech Republic)		BUL (Bulgaria)		NED (Netherlands)		ITA (Italy)		SLO (Slovenia)		CRO (Croatia)		GER (Germany)		FRA (France)		FIN (Finland)		DEN (Denmark)		FRA (France)		Pts
1	(France) Renet	Suzuki	8	6	5	4	1	3	3	2	6	2	4	18	3	6	1	2	1	2	2	6	2	4	1	1	7	4	3	1	2	2	584
2	(Italy) Salvini	Husqvarna	17	13	3	2	5	1	1	3	2	3	3	1	12	7	3	1	3	6	7	4	1	1	18	2	8	5	4	18	4	3	525
3	(Finland) Pyrhonen	Honda	11	4	8	5	7	5	5	1	10	5	11	10	5	2	4	6	11	1	4	10	5	2	20	3	1	1	2	4	7	9	486
4	(France) Vanni	Honda	3	1	1	3	4	9	2	4	4	1	1	2	2	3	18	5	DNS	DNS	Ret	DNS	Ret	12	3	4	4	2	1	5	3	4	477
5	(France) Martin	Husqvarna	10	9	4	7	6	2	18	6	3	8	6	9	4	11	2	4	Ret	3	6	3	19	8	2	11	6	6	7	3	10	5	431
6	(Slovenia) Irt	Honda	15	16	10	6	3	4	4	10	15	9	2	6	Ret	8	8	3	2	5	1	1	4	9	5	19	10	10	Ret	9	6	6	405
7	(Spain) Lozano	Yamaha	DNS	DNS	6	1	10	8			12	4	5	4	Ret	14	5	7	17	4	3	5	3	3	12	6	9	9	DNS	DNS			308
8	(Portugal) Basaula	Suzuki	13	5	9	Ret	Ret	13	10	9	18	16	9	8	9	12	11	13	13	9	16	21	7	7	6	9	5	11	6	6	8	7	302
9	(Denmark) N. Hansen	Suzuki	5	11	7	8	9	12	8	7	9	14					9	10	8	10	10	13	10	13	4	12	Ret	7	5	2	5	Ret	300
10	(Denmark) Jensen	Honda	14	14	DNS	10	12	10	9	8	19	22	12	15	7	13	13	12	9	11	14	17	9	5	8	14	11	13	9	7	16	10	267
11	(Czech Republic) Žerava	Honda	12	12	2	9	8	11	14	Ret	1	6	10	5	11	Ret																	159
12	(Russia) Astaykin	KTM			13	11	16	15			Ret	Ret	8	3	Ret	10	14	11	4	15	18	8	6	Ret									145
13	(Netherlands) Roos	KTM	2	8	12	16	15	6	7	12	24	DNS			6	4							14	10									144
14	(Netherlands) Gijsel	Kawasaki	16	Ret	11	13	14	16			DNS	DNS			15	Ret	16	15	10	12	11	14	13	Ret	7	13			11	13	18	Ret	140
15	(Switzerland) Wicht	Honda			14	24					7	Ret			16	18	7	Ret			13	2	11	Ret	17	17					Ret	8	104
16	(Portugal) J.Rodrigues	Aprilia															6	8	5	13	5	7			13	18					Ret	DNS	93
17	(United Kingdom) Anderson	Honda	4	2											1	1																	90
18	(Slovenia) Kragelj	Yamaha									8	Ret					12	9	6	7	12	9											84
19	(Belgium) Martens	KTM	Ret	17	DNS	15	11	17			Ret	19	14	11	10	9			14	Ret													73
20	(Chile) P. Quintanilla	Honda							6	5			7	7	14	15																	72
21	(Austria) Rüf	Suzuki	Ret	Ret	23	23	19	20	Ret	18	28	25	15	14	Ret	24	Ret	20	20	Ret	21	20	21	18	11	7	15	16	13	Ret	20	18	72
22	(Sweden) Söderström	Kawasaki													8	5											3	3					69
23	(Portugal) Santos	Aprilia					2	7																							9	14	55
24	(France) Boog	Suzuki																													1	1	50
25	(France) Sandouly	Honda			15	14					20	20					19	Ret	16	Ret					10	5							49
26	(Czech Republic) Kadleček	TM									17	11					10	Ret					8	11									48
27	(Czech Republic) Zaremba	KTM									5	15					Ret	DNS			9	11											44
28	(Croatia) Sipek	KTM															25	Ret	7	8	15	12											42
29	(Belgium) Breugelmans	KTM	1	7	DNS	DNS																											39
30	(United Kingdom) Rose	Honda	6	3																													35
31	(France) Lepine	Honda																							9	8					17	16	34
32	(Italy) Bracesco	Honda															15	Ret	12	14	19	15											30
33	(Finland) Rouhiainen	Yamaha	21	19	22	20					29	24	17	13					Ret	19	23	Ret					14	15					30
34	(Estonia) Lokotar	Yamaha	Ret	18	19	22	20	Ret			25	23	13	12	Ret	DNS	30	Ret	Ret	18	25	23	DNS	DNS									26
35	(United Kingdom) Law	Suzuki	7	10																													25
36	(Denmark) Hvam	Yamaha																											8	11			23
37	(Estonia) Krestinov	KTM																									2	Ret					22
38	(Russia) Ivanutin	Yamaha									11	10																					21
39	(Belgium) Lauryssen	Honda	9	Ret	17	17	22	Ret																									20
40	(Denmark) Wozniak	Yamaha																											12	10			20
41	(Denmark) Sorensen	KTM																											10	12			20
42	(Chile) J. Israel	Honda							11	11																							20
43	(Netherlands) Voorwinden	KTM	20	20	18	12	17	19																									20
44	(France) Demeure	KTM																					DNS	DNS							12	11	19
45	(France) Buffard	Honda																							14	10							18
46	(France) Maurez	Suzuki																													11	13	18
47	(Finland) Nikkila	Yamaha																									12	12					18
48	(France) Saulmier	Kawasaki																					22	20							13	12	18
49	(Switzerland) Buri	Honda															28	Ret							15	15					19	17	18
50	(Austria) Schmidinger	Honda									23	26			22	22	29	19	21	Ret	17	18	17	17									17
51	(Czech Republic) Bartoš	Honda									13	13																					16
52	(Venezuela) Martin	Suzuki							13	13																							16
53	(Switzerland) Burn	Yamaha															22	18													14	15	16
54	(Germany) Hanchen	Honda													23	16							15	16									16
55	(Russia) Tonkov	Yamaha																					Ret	6									15
56	(Ukraine) Morozov	Yamaha															27	21					12	15									15
57	(Argentina) Arco	Yamaha							12	15																							15
58	(Finland) Eriksson	KTM																									13	14					15
59	(Portugal) Venda	Kawasaki					13	14																									15
60	(Finland) Kovalainen	KTM	DNS	DNS							27	Ret			13	19	Ret	DNS					16	Ret			DNS	DNS					15
61	(Italy) Altare	Husqvarna															31	23	24	22	24	Ret	23	22	16	16	21	21	18	19			15
62	(Slovakia) Bucenec	KTM									Ret	7																					14
63	(Denmark) B. Jensen	Suzuki																											20	8			14
64	(Czech Republic) Čepelák	Yamaha									16	12																					14
65	(Sweden) Lindström	KTM																									Ret	8					13
66	(Austria) Staufer	KTM									DNS	DNS									8	Ret											13
67	(United States) Stapleton	Honda																											15	14			13
68	(Denmark) Kongshoj	Yamaha																											14	15			13
69	(Chile) Rojas	Yamaha							17	14																							11
70	(Slovenia) Smrekar	Honda																	15	16													11
71	(Denmark) Mindegaard	Suzuki																											16	16			10
72	(Ukraine) O. Pashchynskyi	KTM															21	16			Ret	16	Ret	Ret									10
73	(Slovakia) Radek	Yamaha									Ret	DNS	16	16					23	Ret	DNS	DNS											10
74	(Ukraine) M. Pashchynskyi	KTM															26	17			20	19	20	19									10
75	(Italy) Bertugli	Yamaha															20	14															8
76	(United Kingdom) Parker	Honda	19	15																													8
77	(Sweden) Sjöberg	KTM	18	Ret	16	Ret	Ret	DNS																									8
78	(Denmark) Randrup	KTM																											17	17			8
79	(Finland) Mattila	Kawasaki																									17	17					8
80	(Belgium) Huysmans	Yamaha																					Ret	14									7
81	(Czech Republic) Masařík	Honda									14	21																					7
82	(France) Guidolin	Yamaha																													15	20	7
83	(Finland) Matikainen	Honda																									16	19					7
84	(Austria) Hirschmugl	KTM																	18	17													7
85	(Netherlands) Advokaat	Honda													18	17																	7
86	(Bulgaria) Avramov	KTM											18	17																			7
87	(Chile) V. Israel	Honda							15	Ret																							6
88	(Chile) Donoso	Honda							21	16																							5
89	(Argentina) Fanello	Honda							16	Ret																							5
90	(Chile) Tudor	Yamaha							20	17																							5
91	(Finland) Silvennoinen	Kawasaki																									19	18					5
92	(Italy) Bricca	Honda															17	Ret															4
93	(Netherlands) Swanenberg	Honda													17	Ret																	4
94	(Czech Republic) Kostelecký	Yamaha									22	17																					4
95	(Finland) Manninen	Honda																									18	20					4
96	(Argentina) Calveras	Kawasaki							19	19																							4
97	(Germany) Wolff	Honda																					18	21									3
98	(Czech Republic) Marek	KTM									26	18																					3
99	(Portugal) R. Rodrigues	Yamaha			Ret	25	Ret	18																									3
100	(Spain) Vazquez	Yamaha			24	21	18	21																									3
101	(Spain) Alvarez	Kawasaki			21	18																											3
102	(Denmark) Munk	Yamaha																											19	20			3
103	(France) Grandou	KTM																							19	20							3
104	(Croatia) Leljak	KTM																	19	20													3
105	(Netherlands) Eijsink	Yamaha													19	20																	3
106	(Bulgaria) Todorov	Yamaha											19	20																			3
107	(France) Bonnemoy	Yamaha																													21	19	2
108	(Bulgaria) Penev	KTM											Ret	19																			2
109	(Czech Republic) Brumla	Kawasaki	22	Ret	25	19					21	Ret																					2
110	(Estonia) Triisa	Honda																									20	Ret					1
111	(Netherlands) Riechers	Honda													20	Ret																	1
112	(Bulgaria) Spasov	Kawasaki											20	Ret																			1
113	(Chile) Noemi	Honda							25	20																							1
114	(Spain) Barragan	Kawasaki			20	Ret																											1
	(Bulgaria) Rashkov	Honda											21	21																			0
	(Croatia) Bozic	KTM															32	Ret	22	21	26	22											0
	(Portugal) Alberto	Suzuki			26	26	21	22																									0
	(France) Paulin	Honda																													22	21	0
	(Netherlands) Nugteren	Honda													24	21																	0
	(Chile) Aravena	Honda							26	21																							0
	(United Kingdom) Bird	Honda													21	Ret																	0
	(Bulgaria) Asenov	Suzuki											22	22																			0
	(Argentina) Guiral	Suzuki							23	22																							0
	(Argentina) Montero	Honda							22	24																							0
	(Italy) Mastronunzio	Honda															24	22															0
	(Belgium) Vanhoenacker	KTM																			22	Ret											0
	(France) Cramponne	KTM																													Ret	22	0
	(Chile) Verschae	Honda							Ret	23																							0
	(Greece) Kouzis	Yamaha											DNS	DNS			23	Ret															0
	(France) Gautronet	Yamaha																													Ret	23	0
	(Croatia) Marovic	Yamaha																			27	24											0
	(Chile) Gouet	Honda							24	Ret																							0
	(Chile) Tagle	Honda							28	25																							0
	(Croatia) Braim	Yamaha																			28	25											0
	(Netherlands) Doornwaard	Yamaha													25	Ret																	0
	(Chile) Cabrera	Yamaha							29	26																							0
	(Chile) Huidobro	Honda							27	Ret																							0
	(France) Piquet	Yamaha			Ret	Ret																											0
	(Chile) Casale	Honda							Ret	Ret																							0
	(Chile) B. Israel	Honda							Ret	Ret																							0
	(Argentina) Sanchez	Honda							Ret	Ret																							0
	(Chile) Pizarro	Yamaha							Ret	Ret																							0
	(Chile) L. Quintanilla	Honda							Ret	Ret																							0
	(Netherlands) van Uden	Honda													Ret	Ret																	0
	(Netherlands) Tuin	Suzuki													Ret	Ret																	0
	(Sweden) Gustavsson	KTM																					Ret	Ret									0
	(Finland) Jumppanen	Honda																									Ret	Ret					0
	(France) Pillot	Yamaha																													Ret	Ret	0
	(Belgium) Salaets	Honda	DNS	DNS											Ret	DNS																	0
	(Finland) Mäkinen	Honda																									Ret	DNS					0
	(Argentina) Schmit	KTM							DNS	DNS																							0
	(Bulgaria) Totev	Honda											DNS	DNS																			0
	(Bulgaria) Lukas	KTM											DNS	DNS																			0
	(Denmark) A.S. Hansen	KTM																					DNS	DNS									0
Pos	Rider	Bike	GBR (United Kingdom)		ESP (Spain)		POR (Portugal)		CHL (Chile)		CZE (Czech Republic)		BUL (Bulgaria)		NED (Netherlands)		ITA (Italy)		SLO (Slovenia)		CRO (Croatia)		GER (Germany)		FRA (France)		FIN (Finland)		DEN (Denmark)		FRA (France)		Pts

Colour	Result
Gold	Winner
Silver	Second place
Bronze	Third place
Green	Points classification
Blue	Non-points classification
Blue	Non-classified finish (NC)
Purple	Retired, not classified (Ret)
Red	Did not qualify (DNQ)
Red	Did not pre-qualify (DNPQ)
Black	Disqualified (DSQ)
White	Did not start (DNS)
White	Withdrew (WD)
White	Race cancelled (C)
Blank	Did not practice (DNP)
Blank	Did not arrive (DNA)
Blank	Excluded (EX)

**Bold** – Pole
Italics – Fastest Lap

=== Manufacturers' standings ===
==== MX1 manufacturers standings ====
Pos	Manufacturer	ITA (Italy)		BUL (Bulgaria)		TUR (Turkey)		BEN (Benelux)		POR (Portugal)		CAT (Catalonia)		GBR (United Kingdom)		FRA (France)		GER (Germany)		LAT (Latvia)		SWE (Sweden)		BEL (Belgium)		CZE (Czech Republic)		NED (Netherlands)		BRA (Brazil)		Pts
1	(Japan) Yamaha	1	C	2	2	1	1	1	2	1	1	3	1	1	2	2	2	2	1	2	1	4	1	4	2	3	2	2	2	3	3	655
2	(Austria) KTM	7	C	3	1	6	6	3	1	4	7	1	2	3	1	1	1	1	3	3	6	1	2	6	1	1	4	8	5	2	5	585
3	(Japan) Honda	3	C	9	9	3	7	2	4	3	3	2	5	2	3	4	5	5	6	1	6	3	6	2	9	2	1	6	3	1	5	543
4	(Japan) Suzuki	2	C	1	7	2	3	4	7	2	2	18	6	6	10	3	Ret	7	2	7	3	2	4	1	3	8	6	1	1	4	1	519
5	(Japan) Kawasaki	13	C	11	10	11	11	Ret	12	9	6	5	9	9	9	12	14	8	14	8	12	8	8	15	8	5	7	10	12	9	8	317
6	(Italy) Aprilia	15	C	13	14	13	15	Ret	Ret	13	13	12	12	18	15	11	11	11	10	11	9	11	10	10	5	10	10	9	16	15	10	245
7	(Italy) TM	4	C	DNS	16	16	17	16	10	12	11	10	14	13	26	9	8	12	9	6	8					17	20	12	9			193
8	(United Kingdom) CCM	8	C	19	Ret	20	Ret	19	18	15	Ret	14	17	15	21	10	10	13	15	12	11	16	11	22	12	13	12	15	15	12	13	169
9	(Sweden) Husaberg													29	28																	0
10	(Sweden) Husqvarna	Ret	C																													0
Pos	Manufacturer	ITA (Italy)		BUL (Bulgaria)		TUR (Turkey)		BEN (Benelux)		POR (Portugal)		CAT (Catalonia)		GBR (United Kingdom)		FRA (France)		GER (Germany)		LAT (Latvia)		SWE (Sweden)		BEL (Belgium)		CZE (Czech Republic)		NED (Netherlands)		BRA (Brazil)		Pts

== Participants ==
All entries taken from the official MX Motocross site.

=== MX1 and MX2 participants ===
Team	Constructor	Class	No	Rider
Aprilia Racing	Aprilia	MX1	15	(Switzerland) Julien Bill
Aprilia Racing	Aprilia	MX1	32	(Belgium) Manuel Priem
JK Datch	Aprilia	MX1	45	(France) Loic Leonce
Shineray MX Team China	Honda	MX1	75	(Belgium) Kevin Wouts
Nouvelle Génération Sport (NGS)	Honda	MX2	17	(France) Jason Clermont
JK Datch	Honda	MX2	47	(France) Pascal Leuret
LS Motors Honda	Honda	MX1	25	(Belgium) Clement Desalle
LS Motors Honda	Honda	MX2	335	(Belgium) Dennis Verbruggen
Honda Latvia Elksni	Honda	MX1	23	(Latvia) Filips Kempelis
Honda Latvia Elksni	Honda	MX1	74	(Latvia) Ivo Steinbergs
Honda Latvia Elksni	Honda	MX2	95	(Latvia) Augusts Justs
CAS Honda	Honda	MX1	10	(Belgium) Cedric Melotte
CAS Honda	Honda	MX1	211	(United Kingdom) Billy MacKenzie
SRS Racing	Honda	MX2	64	(France) Khounsith Vongsana
SRS Racing	Honda	MX2	69	(South Africa) Wyatt Avis
Martin Honda MX	Honda	MX1	14	(Netherlands) Marc De Reuver
Martin Honda MX	Honda	MX1	100	(Belgium) Kevin Strijbos
Kawasaki Racing Team	Kawasaki	MX1	17	(South Africa) Gareth Swanepoel
Kawasaki Racing Team	Kawasaki	MX1	90	(France) Sébastien Pourcel
Sturm Racing Team	Kawasaki	MX1	77	(South Africa) Shannon Terreblanche
CLS	Kawasaki	MX1	20	(France) Gregory Aranda
CLS	Kawasaki	MX2	183	(France) Steven Frossard
CLS	Kawasaki	MX2	519	(France) Loic Rombaut
Bud Racing Kawasaki PSM	Kawasaki	MX1	12	(France) David Vuillemin
Bud Racing Kawasaki PSM	Kawasaki	MX2	21	(France) Gautier Paulin
Red Bull KTM Factory Racing	KTM	MX1	5	(Germany) Maximilian Nagl
Red Bull KTM Factory Racing	KTM	MX2	4	(United Kingdom) Shaun Simpson
Red Bull KTM Factory Racing	KTM	MX2	5	(Portugal) Rui Goncalves
KTM Factory Junior MX2	KTM	MX2	34	(Belgium) Joel Roelants
KTM Factory Junior MX2	KTM	MX2	37	(France) Valentin Teillet
KTM Factory Junior MX2	KTM	MX2	89	(Belgium) Jeremy Van Horebeek
KTM Sarholz Racing	KTM	MX2	27	(Germany) Marcus Schiffer
KTM HDI MX	KTM	MX2	22	(France) Anthony Boissiere
KTM HDI MX	KTM	MX2	23	(Switzerland) Arnaud Tonus
KTM CKK Van Der Haar MX	KTM	MX2	30	(Netherlands) Ceriel Klein Kromhof
KTM Silver Action	KTM	MX1	7	(Spain) Jonathan Barragan
KTM Silver Action	KTM	MX1	37	(Estonia) Gert Krestinov
Red Bull KTM UK	KTM	MX2	7	(United Kingdom) Stephen Sword
Red Bull KTM UK	KTM	MX2	45	(United Kingdom) Jake Nicholls
Beursfoon Suzuki MX	Suzuki	MX2	81	(France) Jeremy Tarroux
Teka Suzuki World MX1	Suzuki	MX1	9	(Belgium) Ken De Dycker
Teka Suzuki World MX1	Suzuki	MX1	11	(Belgium) Steve Ramon
Teka Suzuki Europe World MX2	Suzuki	MX2	94	(Germany) Ken Roczen
Teka Suzuki Europe World MX2	Suzuki	MX2	44	(Japan) Yohei Kojima
Teka Suzuki Europe World MX2	Suzuki	MX2	121	(France) Xavier Boog
MVR-D Suzuki	Suzuki	MX1	16	(United Kingdom) James Noble
MVR-D Suzuki	Suzuki	MX2	91	(Latvia) Matiss Karro
Delta-Renter Racing	Suzuki	MX2	153	(Italy) Marco Maddii
Yamaha Red Bull De Carli	Yamaha	MX1	8	(Estonia) Tanel Leok
Yamaha Red Bull De Carli	Yamaha	MX1	222	(Italy) Antonio Cairoli
Yamaha Red Bull De Carli	Yamaha	MX2	501	(Italy) Alessandro Lupino
3C Racing – Yamaha	Yamaha	MX2	13	(Italy) Manuel Monni
3C Racing – Yamaha	Yamaha	MX2	14	(Italy) Deny Philippaerts
MD Racing	Yamaha	MX2	33	(France) Cedric Soubeyras
MD Racing	Yamaha	MX2	685	(France) Steven Lenoir
Yamaha Monster Energy Motocross	Yamaha	MX1	6	(New Zealand) Joshua Coppins
Yamaha Monster Energy Motocross	Yamaha	MX1	19	(Italy) David Philippaerts
Yamaha Van Beers Racing	Yamaha	MX1	56	(Netherlands) Rob Van Vijfeijken
Yamaha Van Beers Racing	Yamaha	MX1	115	(Spain) Carlos Campano
Yamaha Van Beers Racing	Yamaha	MX2	56	(Russia) Evgeny Bobryshew
Yamaha Monster Energy Ricci Motocross Team	Yamaha	MX2	3	(France) Nicolas Aubin
Yamaha Monster Energy Ricci Motocross Team	Yamaha	MX2	39	(Italy) Davide Guarneri
Yamaha Monster Energy Ricci Motocross Team	Yamaha	MX2	202	(France) Loic Larrieu
UTAG YAMAHA.COM	Yamaha	MX2	119	(United Kingdom) Mel Pocock
UTAG YAMAHA.COM	Yamaha	MX2	338	(United States) Zach Osborne
Buildbase CCM Racing-Phoenix Tools CCM Racing	CCM	MX1	24	(United Kingdom) Tom Church
Buildbase CCM Racing-Phoenix Tools CCM Racing	CCM	MX1	46	(United Kingdom) Jason Dougan
TM Racing Factory	TM	MX1	111	(Estonia) Aigar Leok
TM Racing Factory	TM	MX2	131	(Czech Republic) Martin Michek

Key
Regular Rider
Replacement Rider
