= Tijucas =

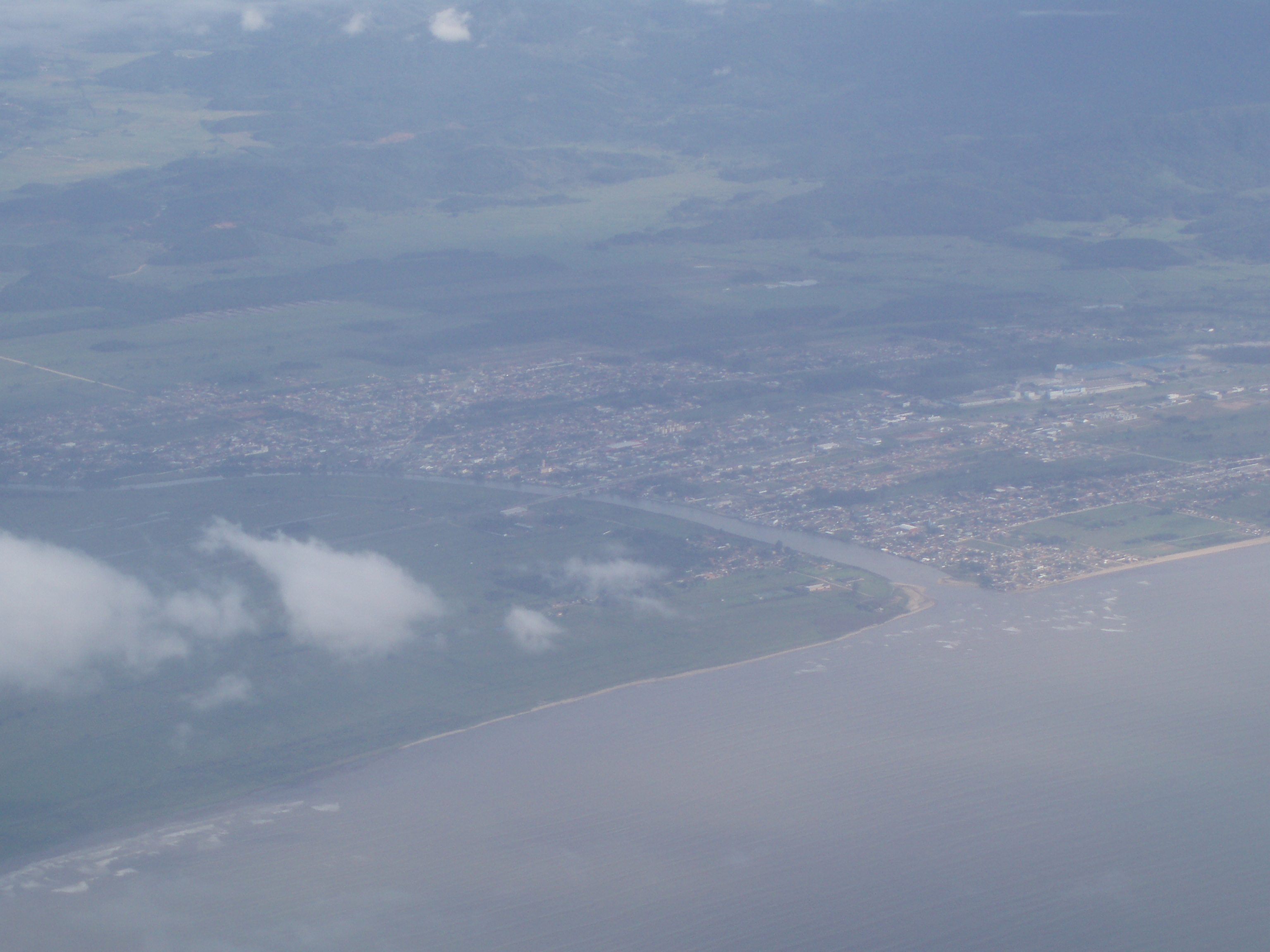

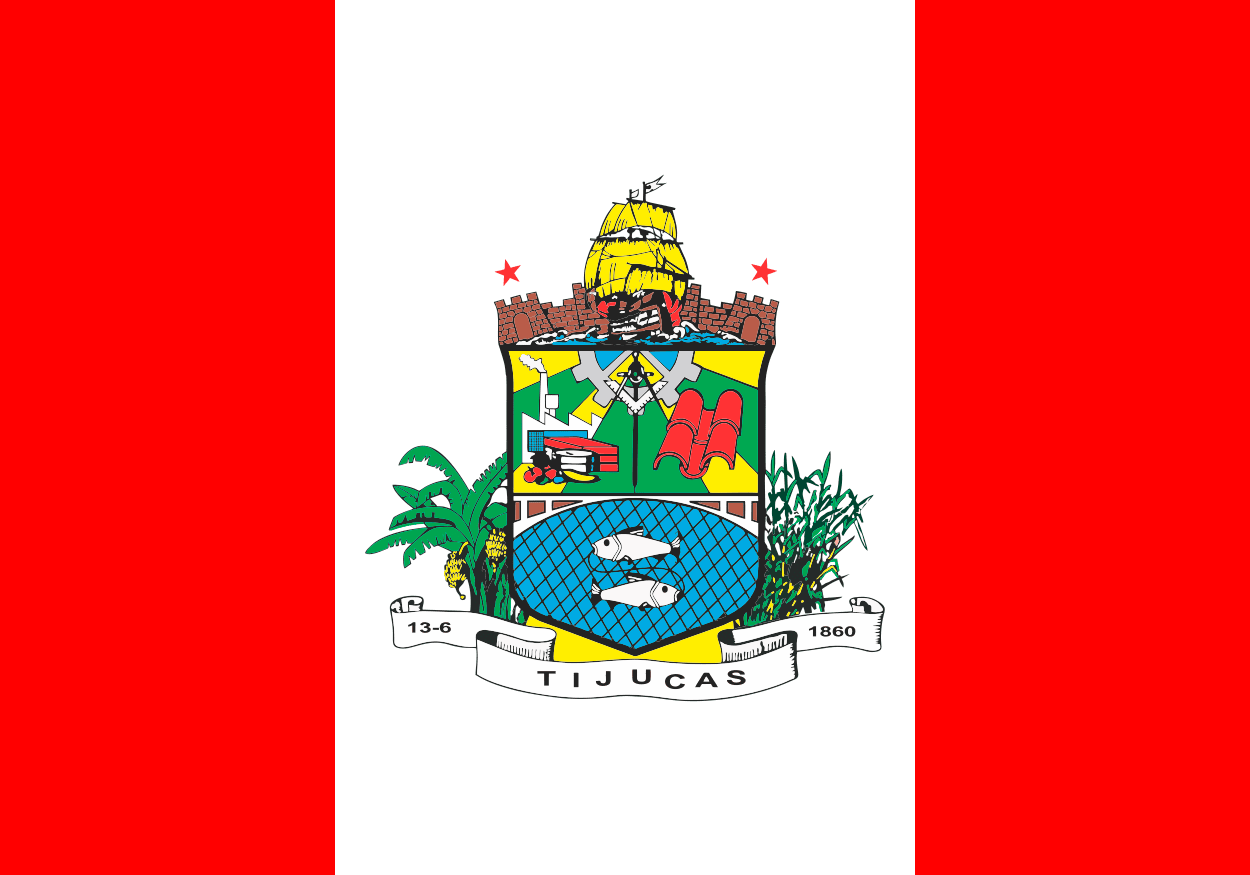
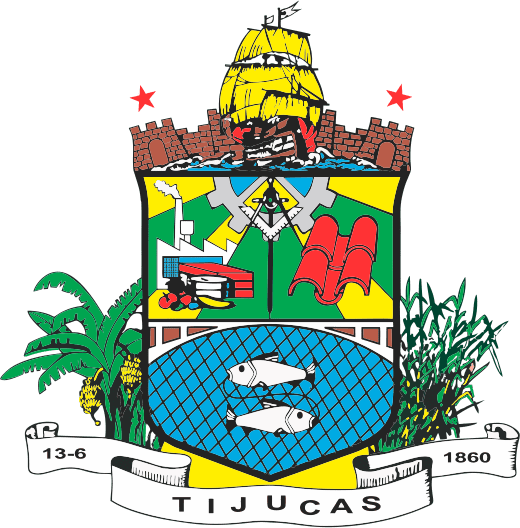
- Flag Coat of arms
- Motto: "Tijucas, land of good energies"
- Location of Tijucas

- Location within Brazil
- Coordinates: 27°14′29″S 48°38′01″W
- Country: Brazil
- Region: South
- State: (Santa Catarina (state)) Santa Catarina
- Founded: June 13, 1860

Government
  - Mayor: Eloi Rocha

Area
  - Total: 276.622 km^{2} (106.804 sq mi)
- Elevation: 2 m (6.6 ft)

Population (2022)
  - Total: 51,592
  - Density: 184.81/km^{2} (478.7/sq mi)
- Time zone: UTC−3 (BRT)
- HDI (2000): 0.835
- Website: www.tijucas.sc.gov.br

Tijucas is a small (278.4 km^{2}) city in the greater Florianópolis metropolitan area, Santa Catarina, Brazil. It was founded on June 13, 1860. It is located at latitude 27°14'29" South and longitude 48°38'01" West, with an altitude of 2 meters. Its population in 2022 was 51,592 inhabitants.

Situated on the margins of the River Tijucas and through Tijucas BR 101 road, its main sources of income are the industries of pottery and agriculture.

Tijucas has a flat central area and interior filled with soft hills and streams.

== Culture ==
The city has large, old houses, some over 100 years old, such as the Mansion of Family Gallotti. The house is one of the oldest noble mansions of the early twentieth century in the state. All materials for the construction of the house (completed 1898) came from Europe and the first residents, the matriarch Chiquinha Gallotti and her family, who dominated the region's economy by working with craft and marketing of native woods, among other commercial activities.

Once a year in front of the Matriz Church a great feast is held, the feast of the Holy Spirit. When performed the party has presence of people from other regions, such as the cities of Canelinha, Itapema, São João Batista, among others. At Christmas time residents perform a live nativity scene in front of the church.
