= Aldo Mongiano =

Italian-Brazilian Catholic bishop (1919–2020)

Aldo Mongiano, I.M.C.
- Bishop of Diocese of Roraima (emeritus)
- Church: Roman Catholic Church
- Diocese: Bishop of Diocese of Roraima(emeritus)
- See: Diocese of Roraima
- In office: 1979–1996
- Predecessor: Servílio Conti
- Successor: Apparecido José Dias
- Previous post: Priest

Orders
- Ordination: 3 June 1943

Personal details
- Born: 1 November 1919 Pontestura, Italy
- Died: 15 April 2020 (aged 100) Moncalvo, Italy

Aldo Mongiano, IMC (1 November 1919 – 15 April 2020) was an Italian-born Brazil-based bishop of the Roman Catholic Church. Mongiano was born in Pontestura, Italy, and was ordained a priest on 3 June 1943, from the religious order of the Consolata Missionaries. Mongiano was appointed bishop of the Diocese of Roraima as well as Titular bishop of Nasai on 14 May 1975, and consecrated on 5 October 1975. He resigned as Titular bishop of Nasai and was appointed bishop of Roraima on 4 December 1979. Mongiano retired from the Roraima Diocese on 26 June 1996. Mongiano died on 15 April 2020 at the age of 100 from complications from a broken femur.
