= Centro de Exposições do Centro Administrativo da Bahia =

Exposition center, Salvador, Brazil

Coordinates: 12°56′53″S 38°25′39″W

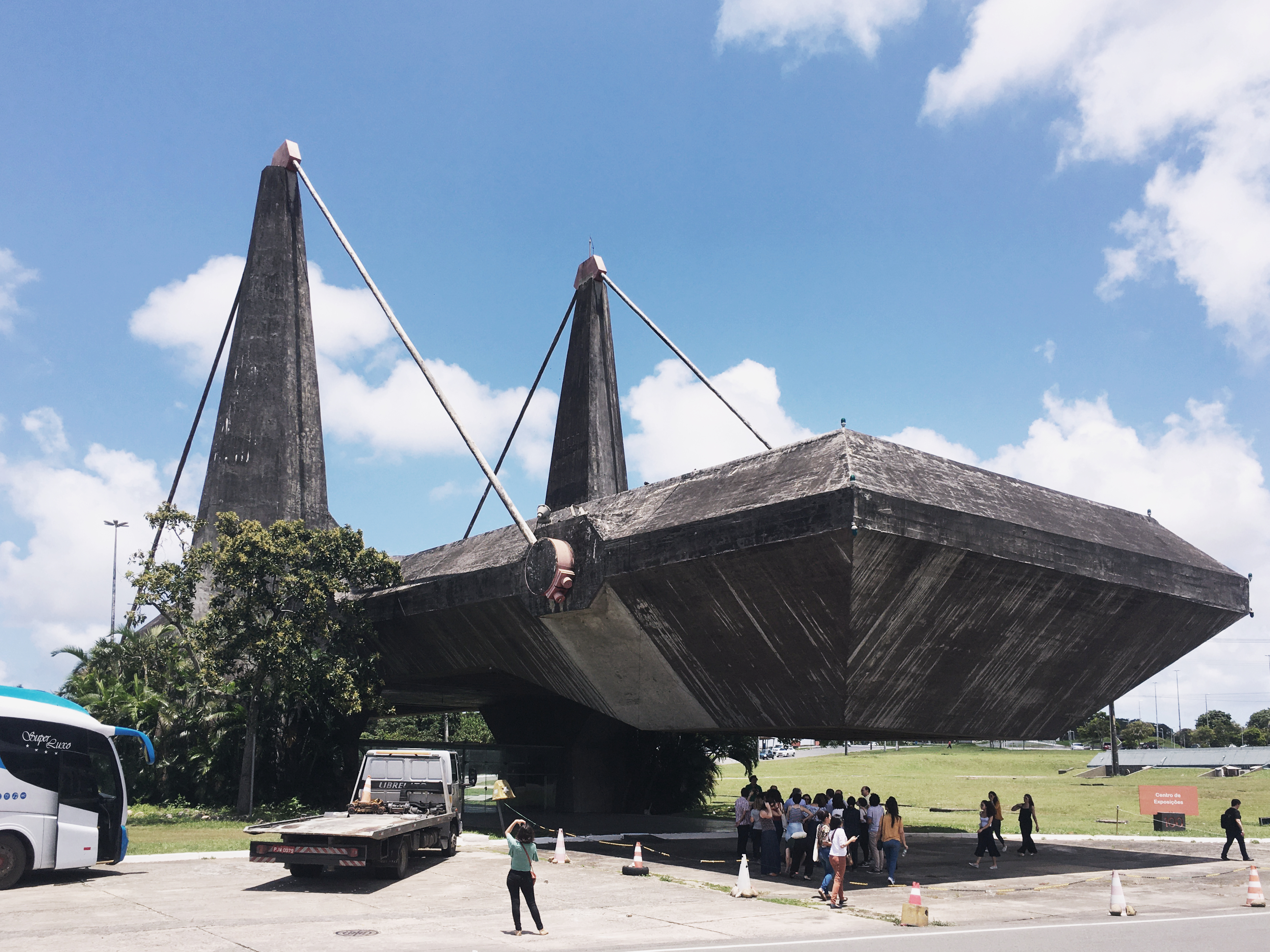
The building in 2019

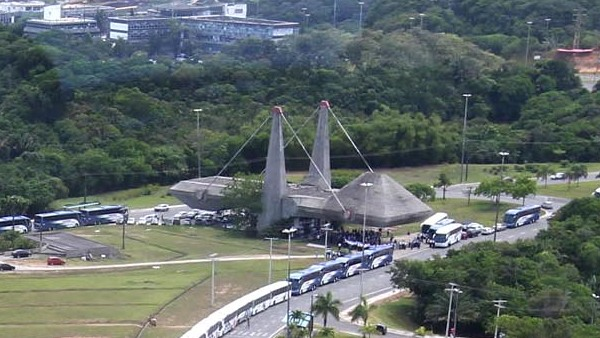
The building in 2011

The Centro de Exposições do Centro Administrativo da Bahia, known as the "Prédio da Balança", "Balance Building" is a brutalist building by João Filgueiras Lima at the Centro Administrativo da Bahia in Bahia, Brazil. It contains an exhibition hall and amphitheater.

The building was designed in 1974 by architect João Filgueiras Lima who was selected by Mário Kertész, the Secretary of Planning, Science, and Technology. The structure marks the entrance to Centro Administrativo da Bahia.

The rectangular concrete building is 52 metres (171 ft) long by 9 metres (30 ft) wide. It is suspended 5 metres (16 ft) above the ground by cables which extend from two identical side towers. Each tower contains a 4-metre (13 ft) cylindrical shaft, with one tower having stairs and the other an elevator. The exhibition hall on one end of the building has a pyramidal ceiling which contains a skylight. The amphitheater at the other end is the inversion of the exhibition hall space. The ground floor contains a reception area and the basement holds the cooling and electrical system.

Upon completion, the building's structural integrity was questioned by the public. To demonstrate it was stable, Lima and Kertész stood underneath as the construction supports were removed. As of 2007, the building hosted a temporary branch of the Banco do Brasil for the use of public servants. As of 2021, the building was in disrepair and no longer used. Renovations have been needed for decades. In 2007, an engineer warned that the building was unstable, with a break of one of the supporting cables being a "ticking time bomb." In 2024 a company was hired to perform emergency shoring work. The work was planned to last 10 months with a total estimated cost of more than R$1.7 million.
