= DIPC =

DIPC may refer to:

- Donostia International Physics Center, Spain
- N,N'-Diisopropylcarbodiimide, a reagent used in peptide synthesis
- Departamento de Investigaciones de la Policía (Police Investigations Department), a former Paraguayan secret police organization
- Dublin International Piano Competition, a classical music competition
