= Canelinha =

- Municipality
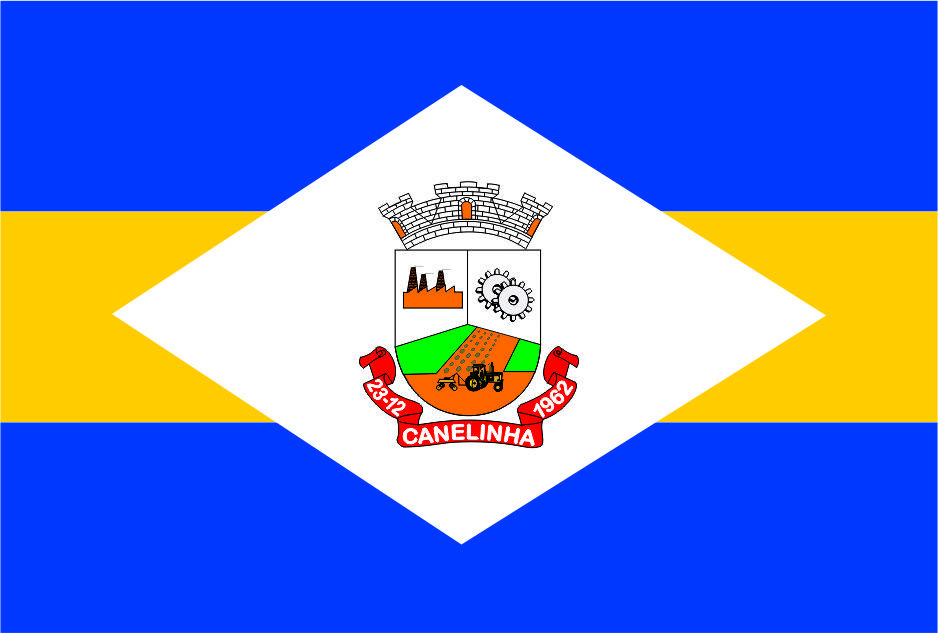
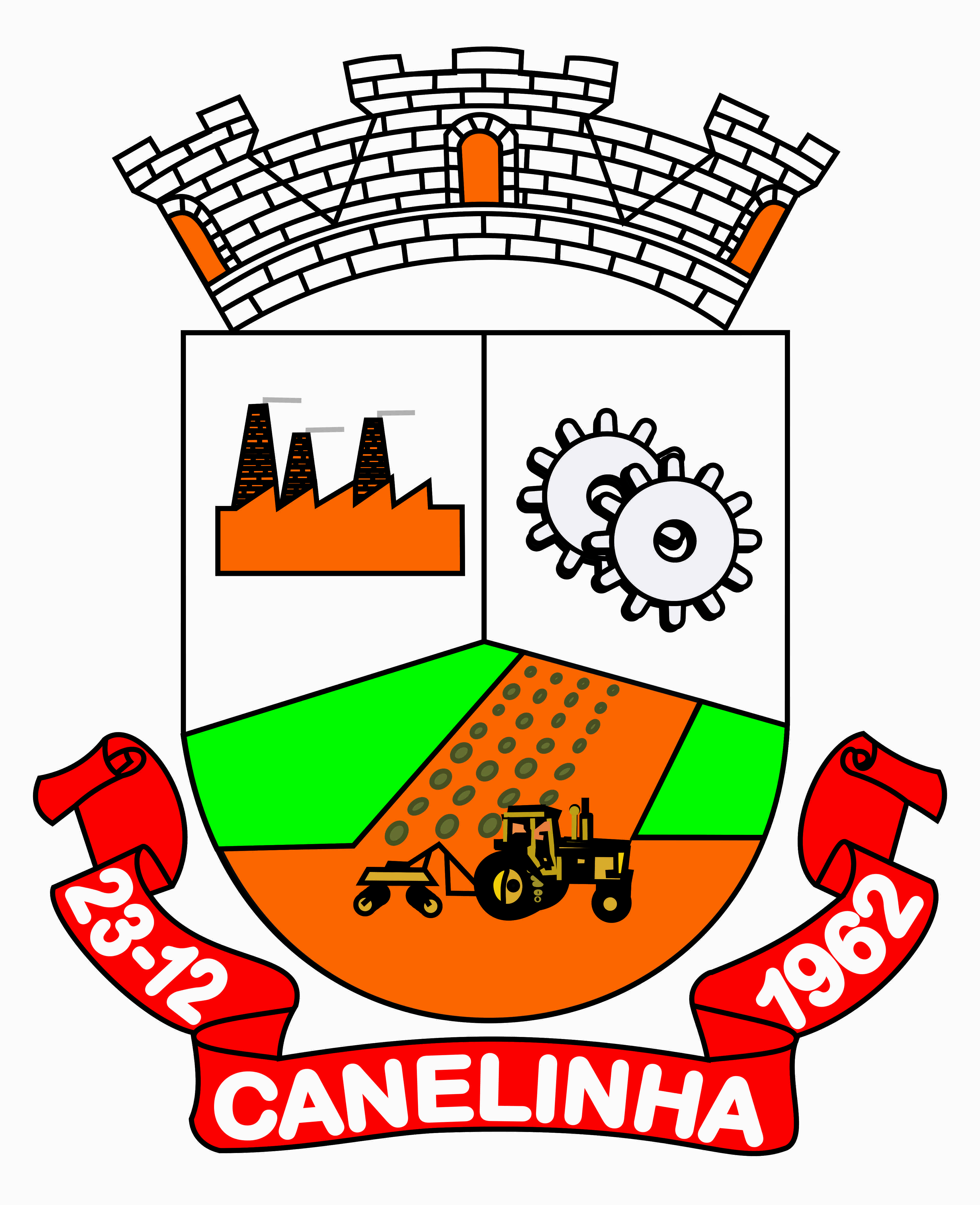
- Flag Coat of arms

- Municipal location

- Location in Brazil
- Coordinates: 27°17′S 48°47′W
- Country: Brazil
- Region: South
- State: Santa Catarina
- Mesoregion: Grande Florianópolis

Area
  - Total: 58.459 sq mi (151.409 km^{2})
- Elevation: 56 ft (17 m)

Population (2020)
  - Total: 12,398
- Time zone: UTC -3
- Climate: Cfa

Canelinha is a municipality in the state of Santa Catarina in the South region of Brazil. Canelinha is a small town, located 15.2 kilometres (9.4 mi) west of Tijucas and 9.9 kilometres (6.2 mi) by road east of São João Batista. It has an altitude of 17 metres and its population according to the 2020 estimate is 12,398 inhabitants. It has land area of 151.409 km^{2} (58.459 sq mi). The municipality was established on 23 December 1962.

== Economy ==
Canelinha is noted for its ceramics and its large number of potteries, an industry which is very important to the local economy. It also produces clothing, knitwear, shoes, and agricultural products. The locality of Areão in the municipality also contains a motocross track, the Motódromo Arthur Jachovicz, which is a venue for the Campeonatos Catarinense e Brasileiro de motocross.

== See also ==
- List of municipalities in Santa Catarina
