= Inês Etienne Romeu =

Brazilian resistance fighter (1942–2015)

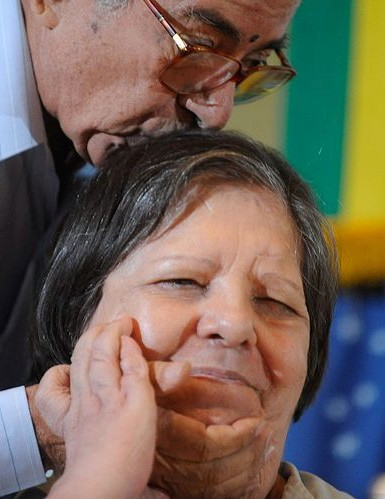
- Inês Etienne Romeu in 2014
- Born: December 18, 1942; Pouso Alegre, Brazil
- Died: April 27, 2015 (aged 72); Niterói, Brazil
- Known for: believed to have been the only captive to survive detention in a Brazilian torture centre known as the Casa da Morte, "the house of death"

Inês Etienne Romeu (December 18, 1942 – April 27, 2015) was a Brazilian political prisoner held in extrajudicial detention in a Brazilian torture camp in the early 1970s. Romeu has been described as the sole captive to survive the camp.

In 2014, Colonel Paulo Malhães testimony to the National Truth Commission revealed that Colonel of the Army Cyro Guedes Etchegoyen was the person in charge of the House of Death. He was head of the Army Information Center (CIE) from 1971 to 1974. He was also in charge of a group Brazilian military sent to train Augusto Pinochet's military personnel. Colonel Etchegoyen was trained at US Army School of the Americas. Paulo Malhães, would later claim that the purpose of the center was to convince suspected political opponents to serve as double agents against regime opponents. The main technique used to turn suspects into double agents was torture, which would be backed up by blackmail and clandestine payments.

== Captive years ==
Romeu was the only captive held in the center who their torturers trusted to serve as a double agent. However, once she was put in the field, her handlers decided she was insincere, and she was re-apprehended and given a life sentence. She ended up being imprisoned for a further eight years, being released in 1979.

== Later life ==
Romeu published a memoir, describing her detention. She described not only torture, but rape and sexual humiliation. She described making three suicide attempts during the 96 days she was held in the torture center. Her handlers video-taped her counting out her clandestine payment, while repeating her mission. She was warned the video would be released to her colleagues, if her handlers were dissatisfied with her efforts. She was warned that if she defected security officials would apprehend her sister in her stead.

In 2003 a man who represented himself as a carpenter entered Romeu's home and attacked her, leaving her with traumatic brain injuries. Nevertheless, she continued to be honored. In 2009, President Luiz Inácio Lula da Silva awarded Romeu with an award for "Right to Memory and Truth".

=== Death ===
Romeu died in Niterói, Brazil, in April, 2015, at the age of 72.
