= List of Hot 100 number-one singles of 2014 (Brazil) =

This is a list of number one singles on the Billboard Brasil Hot 100 chart in 2014. Note that Billboard publishes a monthly chart. Since April 2014, the Brazilian Billboard began publishing on its Brazilian site, the weekly Hot 100, as it is, and has always been held at the site, and Billboard magazine in other countries as well as the American Billboard.

== Chart history ==
Issue date	Song	Artist(s)	Reference
January	"Zen"	Anitta	
February 1	"Zen"	Anitta	
February 8	"Zen"	Anitta	
February 15	"Zen"	Anitta	
February 22	"Zen"	Anitta	
March 1	"Zen"	Anitta	
March 8	"Zen"	Anitta	
March 15	"O Tempo Não Apaga"	Victor & Leo	
March 22	"O Tempo Não Apaga"	Victor & Leo	
March 29	"Cê Topa?"	Luan Santana	
April 4	"O Tempo Não Apaga"	Victor & Leo	
April 12	"Cê Topa?"	Luan Santana	
April 23	"Cê Topa?"	Luan Santana	
April 27	"Cê Topa?"	Luan Santana	
May 4	"Cê Topa?"	Luan Santana	
May 12	"Cê Topa?"	Luan Santana	
May 17	"O Tempo Não Apaga"	Victor & Leo	
May 24	"Cê Topa?"	Luan Santana	
June 3	"Cê Topa?"	Luan Santana	
June 9	"Cê Topa?"	Luan Santana	
June 16	"Cê Topa?"	Luan Santana	
June 21	"Vou Te Amarrar Na Minha Cama"	Bruno & Marrone	
June 28	"Cê Topa?"	Luan Santana	
July 5	"Cê Topa?"	Luan Santana	
July 12	"Cê Topa?"	Luan Santana	
July 19	"Cê Topa?"	Luan Santana	
July 26	"Vou Te Amarrar Na Minha Cama"	Bruno & Marrone	
August 2	"Tudo com Você"	Victor & Leo	
August 9	"Tudo com Você"	Victor & Leo	
August 16	"Tudo com Você"	Victor & Leo	
August 26	"Tudo com Você"	Victor & Leo	
August 31	"Tudo com Você"	Victor & Leo	
September 6	"Tudo com Você"	Victor & Leo	
September 13	"Tudo com Você"	Victor & Leo	
September 20	"Tudo com Você"	Victor & Leo	
September 27	"Tudo com Você"	Victor & Leo	
October 4	"Tudo com Você"	Victor & Leo	
October 11	"Tudo com Você"	Victor & Leo	
October 18	"Tudo com Você"	Victor & Leo	
October 25	"Tudo com Você"	Victor & Leo	
November 1	"Tudo com Você"	Victor & Leo	
November 8	"Tudo com Você"	Victor & Leo	
November 15	"Tudo com Você"	Victor & Leo	
November 22	"Cuida Bem Dela"	Henrique & Juliano	
November 29	"Cuida Bem Dela"	Henrique & Juliano	
December 6	"Cuida Bem Dela"	Henrique & Juliano	
December 13	"Cuida Bem Dela"	Henrique & Juliano	
December 20	"Cuida Bem Dela"	Henrique & Juliano	
December 27	"Cuida Bem Dela"	Henrique & Juliano	

== See also ==
- Billboard Brasil
- List of number-one pop hits of 2013 (Brazil)
- Crowley Broadcast Analysis
