= National Police of Paraguay =

Police force in Paraguay

National Police of Paraguay Policía Nacional del Paraguay
- Logo of the PNP

- Abbreviation: PNP

Agency overview
- Formed: March 8, 1843; 183 years ago
- Preceding agency: Asunción Police Department
- Employees: 30,000

Jurisdictional structure
- National agency: Paraguay
- Operations jurisdiction: Paraguay
- Constituting instrument: Constitution of Paraguay
- General nature: Civilian police

Operational structure
- Headquarters: Asunción
- Appointed minister responsible: Dr. Juan Ernesto Villamayor, Minister of Internal Affairs
- Agency executives: General Commissioner Director Bartolomé Gustavo Báez López., Commander; General Commissioner Director Luis Pablo Cantero Vázquez., Deputy Commander
- Parent agency: Ministry of Internal Affairs; Public Force (Fuerzas Pública)

Facilities
- Policings: Helipuerto Polica Nacional; Silvio Pettirossi International Airport (until 2010)

Notables
- Anniversary: March 8 August 20
- Award: Order of the Fatherland

Website
- Policía Nacional – Paraguay
- The Himno de la Policía Nacional del Paraguay is the official song and march of the PNP.

The National Police of Paraguay (Spanish: Policía Nacional del Paraguay, PNP) is the main law-enforcement agency in Paraguay, operating under the auspices of the Ministry of Internal Affairs. It is responsible for ensuring the internal security of the nation.

== History ==
The first Paraguayan Police force was established in 1843, then known as the Asunción Police Department under the leadership of Pedro Nolazco Fernández. In 1992, Paraguay's government ratified a new constitution, which put policing duties under the newly formed National Police (Policia Nacional), which came under the interior ministry. In 2010, the PNP established a new aviation unit, called the Unidad de aviación (Aviation Unit), which operates helicopters to support policing operations in the air.

In August 2023, Distributed Denial of Secrets published over 500,000 documents and other files from the National Police of Paraguay.

== Mission ==
The PNP is an institution with permanent high precedence in the constitution, with the mission of protecting life, preserving public order, and security and integrity of people. It is designed to guarantee individual and social development, as well as the achievement of the harmonious coexistence of the inhabitants of Paraguay, through the execution of coordinated, efficient, and transparent actions.

== Organization ==
The National Police is directed by the General Commissioner Director, assisted by the Deputy General Commissioner Director for the General Directorates. It is composed of many training institutions, armed units, and general directorates, all under the auspices of the police command headquarters in the capital.

=== Training institutes ===
- Asuncion Police Academy
- General José Eduvigis Díaz Police Academy
- Sergeant Assistant José Merlo Sarabia Police College
- Remberto Giménez Apprentice School
- School of Physical Education
- Institute of Criminalistics

=== Improvement institutes ===
- School of Police Strategy
- School of Chiefs and Police Advice
- School of Professional Specialization
- School of Application for NCOs

=== General Directorates ===
- General Directorate of Human Talent
- General Directorate of Prevention and Security
- General Directorate of Criminal Investigation
- General Directorate of Police Intelligence
- General Directorate of the Higher Institute of Police Education
- General Directorate of Police Justice
- General Directorate of Administration and Finance
- General Directorate of Police Health

=== Technical Support Directorates ===
- Crime Investigation Department
- Economic Department
- Anti-narcotics Department
- Department of Communications
- Automotive Control Department
- IT Department
- Department of Identifications
- Judicial Department
- Department of Family
- Legal Assistance Department
- Anti-kidnapping Department
- Intelligence Department
- Anti-terrorism Department

=== Tactical Support Directorate ===
- Specialized Group
- Special Police Operations Forces (FOPE Group)
- Security Group
- Traffic Group
- Ecological and Rural Group
- Airport Group
- Anti-rustling Group
- Fire Brigade
- Mounted Group
- Motorized Group
- PNP Aviation Unit
- Tourism Police Division
- Department of Forestry and Environmental Affairs
- Security of Educational Centers

=== Police stations ===
PNP police stations are police bodies, subordinated to the Departmental Police Headquarters, which are within the limits of a particular zone and execute the activities of the National Police in their particular cities.

== Aviation Unit ==
The unit's current inventory includes the following:

Aircraft	Origin	Type	In service
Bell UH-1 Iroquois	United States	policing	4
CASA C-212 Aviocar	Spain	transport	1
Robinson R44	United States	policing	1
Mil Mi-8	Russia	policing	1

All helicopters of the PNP Aviation Unit are based at the Helipuerto Polica Nacional in Asuncion. The Silvio Pettirossi International Airport was initially used by PNP Aviation Unit, but later moved to Helipuerto Polica Nacional, which opened in August 2010.
