= List of number-one pop hits of 2014 (Brazil) =

This is a list of number one singles on the Billboard Brasil Hot 100 chart in 2014. Note that Billboard published a monthly chart. Since April 2014, the Brazilian Billboard began publishing on its Brazilian site, the weekly Hot 100, as it is, and has always been held at the site, and Billboard magazine in other countries as well as the American Billboard.

== Chart history ==
Issue date	Song	Artist(s)	Reference
January	"Zen"	Anitta	
February	"Zen"	Anitta	
March	"Zen"	Anitta	
April 23	"Blá Blá Blá"	Anitta	
April 27	"Blá Blá Blá"	Anitta	

== See also ==
- Billboard Brasil
- List of number-one pop hits of 2013 (Brazil)
- Crowley Broadcast Analysis
