= João Nílson Zunino =

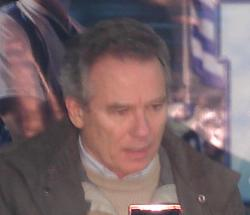
Zunino.

João Nílson Zunino commonly known as Zunino (9 April 1946 – 23 December 2014) was the president of Avaí Futebol Clube from 2002 until 2013, succeeding Flávio Ricardo Félix. He was also a cardiology doctor and a businessman. He was born in São João Batista, Brazil. Zunino died on 23 December 2014 in Florianópolis.
