= Henry Maksoud =

Brazilian civil engineer (1929–2014)

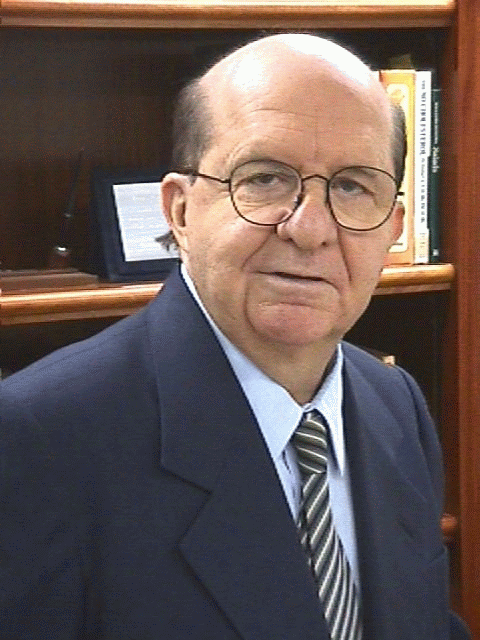
- Born: March 8, 1929; Aquidauana, Mato Grosso do Sul, Brazil
- Died: April 17, 2014 (aged 85); São Paulo, Brazil
- Occupations: Founder, Maksoud Group and Maksoud Plaza,
- Relatives: Henry Maksoud Neto (grandson)

Henry Maksoud (March 8, 1929 – April 17, 2014) was a Brazilian businessman, engineer, champion of liberal ideals and founder of the legendary hotel Maksoud Plaza, located in São Paulo, Brazil.

== Biography ==
Henry Maksoud, who was of Syrian-Lebanese descent, was married to Ilde Maksoud until 1993. Later, he married Georgina Celia Bizerra Maksoud, with whom he stayed until his death at the age of 85. A year before, due to health issues, he handed off the presidency of the Maksoud Plaza temporarily to his grandson Henry Maksoud Neto who had been working with him since the age of 15. After his death of lung cancer, on April 17, 2014, Neto assumed the presidency officially.

Maksoud was a Civil and Electrical engineer and received the title of Master of Science in Fluid Mechanics, from the University of Iowa. He was the owner of the hotel Maksoud Plaza, the Visão magazine and the engineering firm Hidroservice. From 1967 to 1968, he was Chairman of the Engineering Institute of São Paulo. The economist and philosopher Friedrich Hayek, awarded Nobel Prize in Economics in 1974, became a close friend of Henry Maksoud. The friendship resulted in Hayek's visit to Brazil a number of times in order to promote liberalism. Maksoud advocated to economic liberalism, criticising the dictatorial regime in Brazil. He supported individual freedom, representative democracy and the rule of law.

From 1988 until the early '90s, Maksoud led a program on TV Bandeirantes called "Henry Maksoud e Você", where he presented issues and discussed it with well-known interlocutors. Towards a Brazilian democratization context, in 1988, Henry Maksoud proposed a Liberal Constitution, based on Hayek's theories, which was divided into 10 titles, 218 articles, and 294 paragraphs, and it considered that the country should adopt a form of government in which the law prevailed and not the men or the parties, called Demarchy.

In addition to his business career, Maksoud was an author and director of theatrical plays, including "Everlasting Emotions – A Musical Chronicle" presented at the Maksoud Plaza Theatre.
