= Luiz Alberto Dias Menezes =

Brazilian geologist

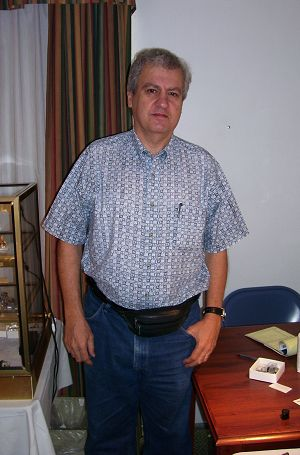
Luiz Menezes

Luiz Alberto Dias Menezes (5 October 1950 – 9 July 2014) was a geologist, mineralogist and mineral dealer from Brazil. He was born in São Paulo.

He collected the material that was used for the discovery of new mineral was named in his honor as menezesite. He also contributed extensively in mineralogy of Brazil, participating in the discovery of up to seven mineral species.

He trained as a mining engineer. He began working in the mine Jacupiranga in mining operations, crushing, and as a process engineer at the plant flotation of apatite. Worked his way up in the company where he worked for 15 years, to be the director of the division of engineering and development. In 1988 he founded the company Luiz Menezes Mining and began trading with minerals.

He was a founder of the Club of Sciences Campo Belo (Clube de Ciencias Campo Belo) in 1961 and the Brazilian Association of Mineralogy (Associação Brasileira Mineralogy) in 1965. He was also director of the Brazilian Association of Gemology and Mineralogy, and president of the Friends of the Museum of Geosciences USP.
