= Pierre Renet =

French motorcycle racer

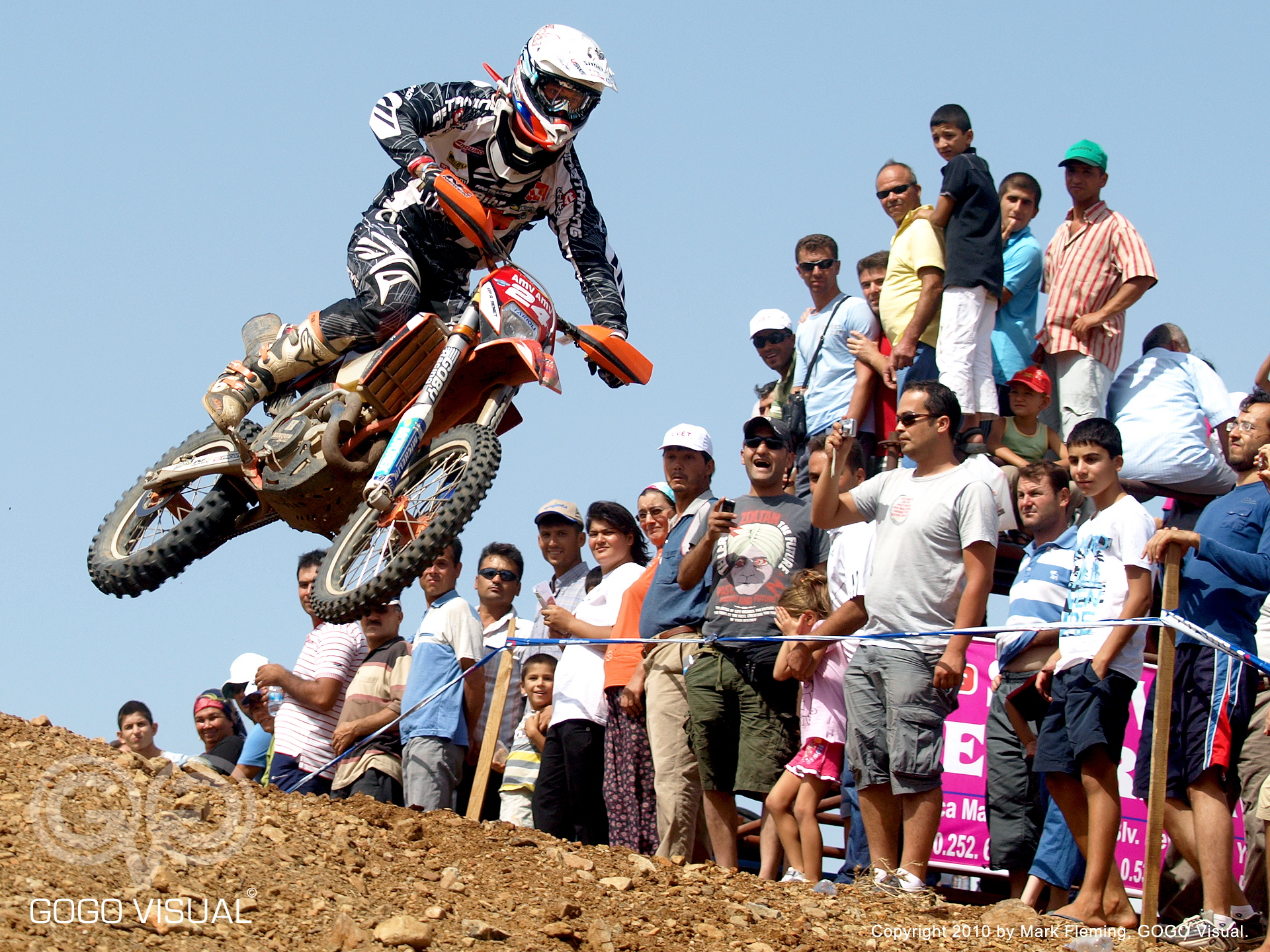
- Renet in 2010.
- Nationality: French
- Born: Pierre-Alexandre Renet; 2 October 1984 (age 41) Cherbourg, France

Motocross career
- Years active: 2005 - 2009
- Teams: Yamaha (2005); Honda (2006-2007); Suzuki (2008-2009)
- Championships: 1
- Wins: 5

Pierre-Alexandre Renet (born 2 October 1984) is a former French professional motocross rider, world champion in MX3 class in 2009.
