= Paulo Malhães =

Brazilian Army officer (1938–2014)

- Born: April 17, 1938
- Died: April 25, 2014 (aged 76); Nova Iguaçu
- Occupation: Army officer
- Known for: admitted torturing and murdering dissidents

Paulo Malhães was a Brazilian Army officer who died during a home invasion and robbery. Shortly before his death Malhães had acknowledged he had tortured and killed dissidents during the Brazilian military dictatorship, and was unapologetic for doing so. According to the South China Morning Post his death was suspected to have been an act of retaliation, but his autopsy demonstrated that he died of a heart attack.

Malhães first spoke about serving as a torturer in 2012, to the Truth Commission, forty years after he had been assigned to manage a safehouse in Petrópolis, colloquially known as Casa da Morte—the "house of death"—where torture was routine. His work in 1970-1972 consisted of torture and interrogation of suspected political opponents of the regime. According to Malhães, the nominal goal of the activities in the safe house was to convince the suspects to agree to serve as double agents. According to Malhães, in addition to ending their torture those suspects who agreed to serve as double agents would receive clandestine payments as incentives. However, the only suspect he described agreeing to serve as a double agent, Inês Etienne Romeu, was later deemed to have been insincere, and was imprisoned for a further eight years. Details of the activities at the "house of death" as the safehouse was colloquially known were first confirmed in her 1979 memoirs. At least 22 suspects held in the house died.

Malhães acknowledged that Carlos Alberto Soares de Freitas, a high-profile regime opponent who had disappeared, and was never seen again, had been held in the house. But he claimed that former Congressman Rubens Paiva must have been held elsewhere.
