= Diocese of Roraima =

Catholic ecclesiastical territory

Diocese of Roraima Dioecesis Roraimensis

Catholic
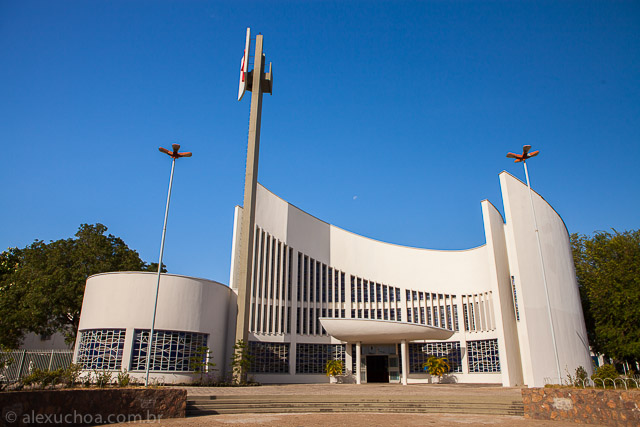
- Cathedral of Christ the Redemer, Roraima

Location
- Country: Brazil
- Ecclesiastical province: Manaus

Statistics
- Area: 230,104 km^{2} (88,844 sq mi)
- Population: Total; Catholics: (as of 2004); 324,397; 200,000 (61.7%)

Information
- Denomination: Catholic Church
- Rite: Latin Rite
- Established: 21 April 1934 (92 years ago)
- Cathedral: Catedral Cristo Redentor, Boa Vista

Current leadership
- Pope: Leo XIV
- Bishop: Evaristo Pascoal Spengler, O.F.M.
- Metropolitan Archbishop: Leonardo Ulrich Steiner, O.F.M.

The Roman Catholic Diocese of Roraima (Latin: Dioecesis Roraimensis) is a diocese located in the state of Roraima in the ecclesiastical province of Manaus in Brazil.

== History ==
- 1934: Established as Apostolic Administration of Rio Branco
- August 30, 1944: Promoted as Territorial Prelature of Rio Branco
- April 29, 1963: Renamed as Territorial Prelature of Roraima
- October 16, 1979: Promoted as Diocese of Roraima

== Leadership ==
Prelates of Roraima

- José Nepote-Fus, I.M.C. (18 April 1952 – December 1965), resigned
- Servílio Conti, I.M.C. (1 January 1965 – 3 May 1975), resigned
- Aldo Mongiano, I.M.C. (14 May 1975 – 4 December 1979), see below

Bishops of Roraima

- Aldo Mongiano, I.M.C. (4 December 1979 Appointed – 26 June 1996), resigned
- Aparecido José Dias, S.V.D. (26 June 1996 – 29 May 2004)
- Roque Paloschi (18 May 2005 – 14 October 2015), appointed Archbishop of Porto Velho, Rondonia
- Mário Antônio da Silva (22 June 2016 – 23 February 2022), appointed Archbishop of Cuiabá, Mato Grosso
- Evaristo Pascoal Spengler, O.F.M. (23 January 2023 – Present)
