= João Filgueiras Lima =

Brazilian architect

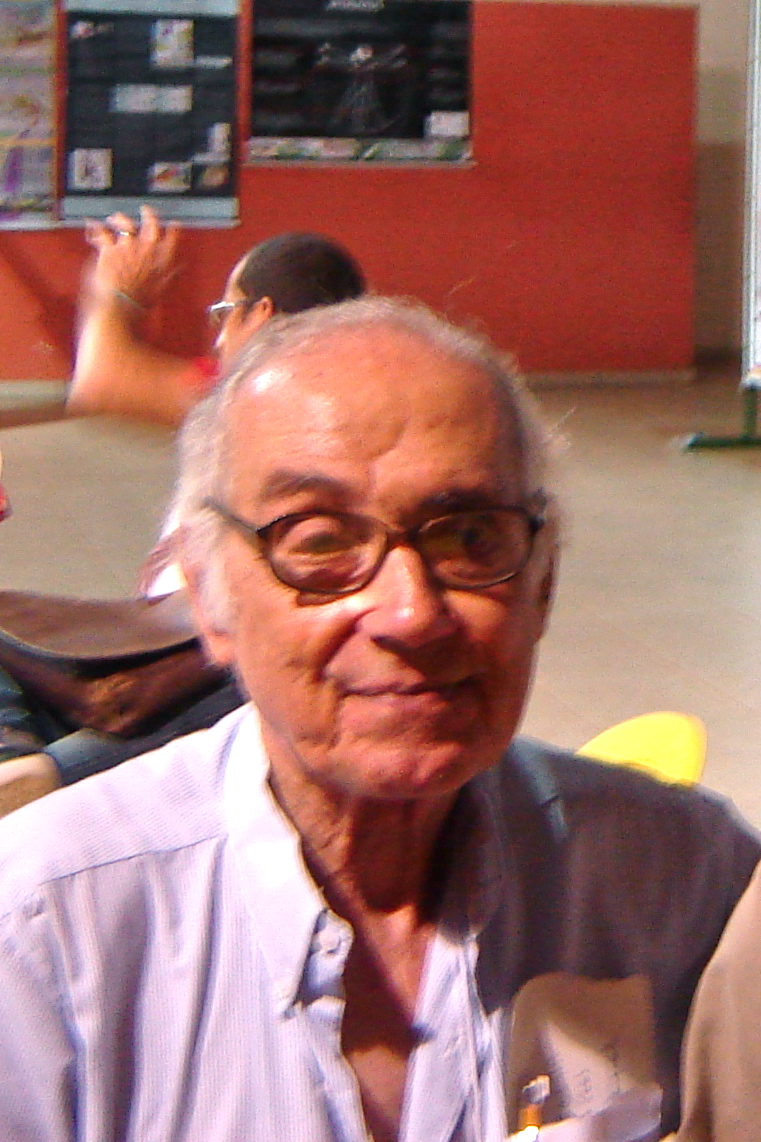
- Born: June 19, 1931; Rio de Janeiro
- Died: May 21, 2014 (aged 82)
- Occupation: Architect
- Awards: Grand Prize of the Biennale of Architecture an Engineering in Madrid to Mexico.

João Filgueiras Lima (June 19, 1931 – May 21, 2014) was a Brazilian architect, also known as Lelé. He won the Grand Prize of the Biennale of Architecture an Engineering in Madrid to Mexico.
