= List of number-one pop hits of 2013 (Brazil) =

This is a list of number one singles on the Billboard Brasil Hot 100 chart in 2013. Note that Billboard publishes a monthly chart.

== Chart history ==
Issue date	Song	Artist(s)	Reference
January	"Diamonds"	Rihanna	
February	"Diamonds"	Rihanna	
March	"Diamonds"	Rihanna	
April	"93 Million Miles"	Jason Mraz	
May	"93 Million Miles"	Jason Mraz	
June	"Girl on Fire"	Alicia Keys	
July	"Show das Poderosas"	Anitta	
August	"Show das Poderosas"	Anitta	
September	"Não Para"	Anitta	
October	"Não Para"	Anitta	
November	"When I Was Your Man"	Bruno Mars	
December	"Wake Me Up"	Avicii	

== See also ==
- Billboard Brasil
- List of number-one pop hits of 2012 (Brazil)
- Crowley Broadcast Analysis
