= Servílio Conti =

Italian Roman Catholic bishop

Maffeo Giovanni Ducoli, I.M.C.
- Titular Bishop of Thuburbo Maiu
- Church: Roman Catholic Church
- See: Titular See of Thuburbo Maiu
- In office: 1968 -
- Predecessor: François Gerboin
- Successor: incumbent
- Previous post: Prelate

Orders
- Ordination: April 8, 1944

Personal details
- Born: October 19, 1916 Vertova, Italy
- Died: September 14, 2014 (aged 97)

Servílio Conti, I.M.C. (October 19, 1916 – September 14, 2014) was an Italian prelate of the Roman Catholic Church. At the time of his death was one of the oldest Roman Catholic bishops and one of the oldest Italian bishops.

Conti was born in Vertova, Italy and was ordained a priest of the religious order of Consolata Missionary on April 8, 1944. Conti was appointed Prelate to the Diocese of Roraima (Brazil) on January 1, 1965 and resigned May 3, 1975. Conti was appointed Titular Bishop of Thuburbo Maiu on February 8, 1968 and ordained on May 5, 1968.
