= Law enforcement in Paraguay =

Law enforcement in Paraguay is primarily the responsibility of the National Police of Paraguay.

== Law enforcement organizations of Paraguay ==
=== Historical secret police organizations ===
- División Técnica de Represión del Comunismo (Technical Division for the Repression of Communism)
- Departamento de Investigaciones de la Policía (DIPC) (Police Investigations Department)

=== Currently ===
- National Police of Paraguay

== See also ==
- Crime in Paraguay
