= São João Batista, Santa Catarina =

Coordinates: 27°16′33″S 48°50′56″W

- Municipality
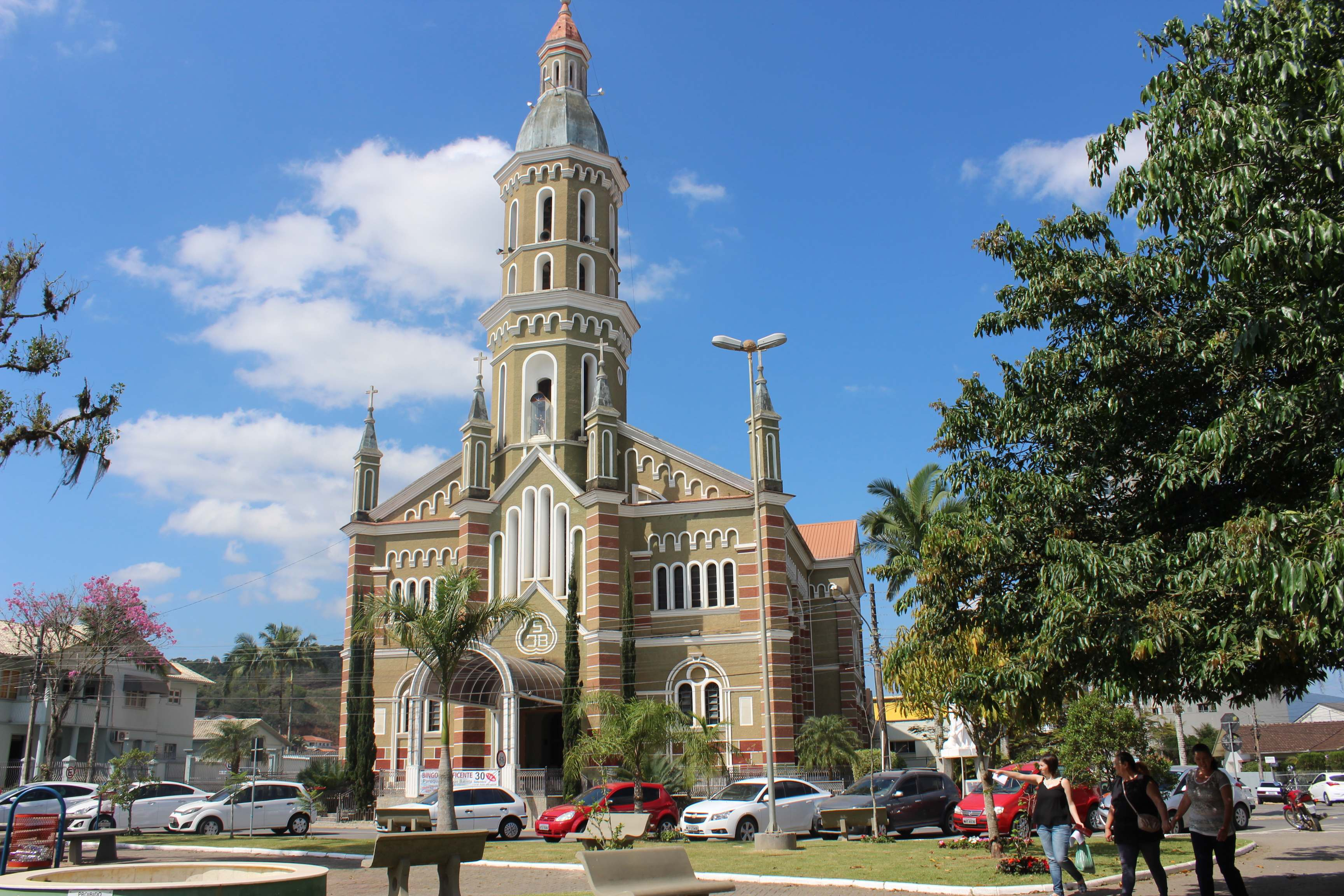

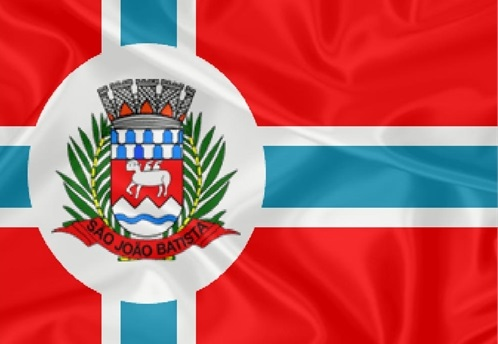
- Flag Coat of arms
- Interactive map of São João Batista, Santa Catarina
- Country: Brazil
- Region: South
- State: Santa Catarina
- Mesoregion: Grande Florianópolis

Population (2020)
  - Total: 38,583
- Time zone: UTC -3

São João Batista is a municipality in the state of Santa Catarina in the South region of Brazil.

== See also ==
- List of municipalities in Santa Catarina
