= WZPL =

Radio station in Greenfield–Indianapolis, Indiana

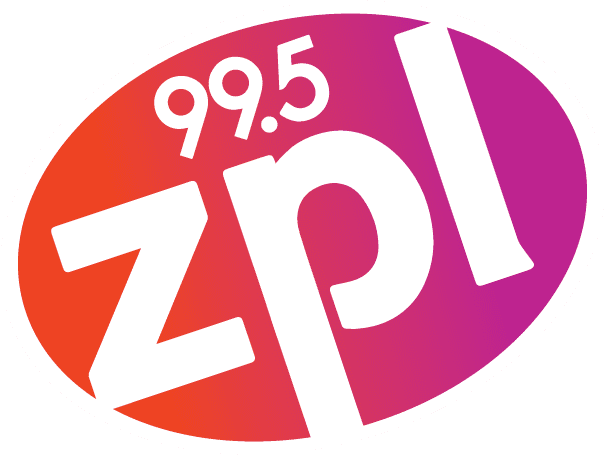

Greenfield, Indiana; United States
- Broadcast area: Indianapolis, Indiana
- Frequency: 99.5 MHz (HD Radio)
- Branding: 99-5 ZPL

Programming
- Format: Contemporary hit radio
- Subchannels: HD2: Sports radio (WXNT simulcast)

Ownership
- Owner: Cumulus Media; (Radio License Holding SRC LLC)
- Sister stations: WFMS, WJJK, WNTR, WXNT, WNDX

History
- First air date: June 1, 1962; 63 years ago
- Former call signs: WSMJ (1962–1979); WIKS-FM (1979–1983)
- Call sign meaning: Indianapolis or the Tagline "Indy's new ApPLe" and/or its nickname "Z-PeeL"

Technical information
- Licensing authority: FCC
- Facility ID: 47144
- Class: B
- ERP: 19,000 watts
- HAAT: 236 meters (774 ft)
- Transmitter coordinates: 39.760°N 86.006°W

Links
- Public license information: Public file; LMS
- Webcast: Listen live
- Website: www.wzpl.com

WZPL (99.5 FM) is a radio station licensed to Greenfield, Indiana, and serving the Indianapolis metropolitan area. The station airs a contemporary hit radio format. WZPL is owned by Cumulus Media. Its studios are located on North Shadeland Avenue on the city's east side, with its transmitter north of the Indianapolis World Sports Park on the east side of Indianapolis.

== History ==
The station signed on as WSMJ on June 1, 1962, and remained as such until the spring of 1979 when WSMJ was sold to Heftel Broadcasting. They changed to a disco music format and adopted the call sign WIKS-FM, "Rock Kiss 99 FM", on April 14, 1979. Later, a contemporary hit radio format was adopted which, aside from a brief experiment playing classic rock in 1989, has continued to this day. The station was added to both Mediabase and Nielsen BDS Top 40/CHR reporting panels in November 2012.

The station is anchored by The Smiley Morning Show, hosted by Dave Smiley.

In the early 2000s, the station was known as "Z 99-5."

On February 13, 2019, Cumulus Media and Entercom announced an agreement in which WZPL, WNTR, and WXNT would be swapped to Cumulus in exchange for WNSH (now WXBK) in New York City and WHLL and WMAS-FM in Springfield, Massachusetts. Under the terms of the deal, Cumulus began operating WZPL under a local marketing agreement on March 1, 2019. The swap was completed on May 9, 2019.

== HD radio ==
In 2005, WZPL became one of the first Indianapolis-area radio stations to broadcast their signal in HD Radio. In 2006, they introduced a stream of All Comedy Radio, a 24-hour comedy station, also known as "The Laugh Button," on their alternate HD 2 digital channel, and HD 3 as a simulcast of WXNT 1430 AM, CBS Sports Radio. Following the sale of Radio Disney affiliate WRDZ-FM (now hip-hop formatted WZRL) to iHeartMedia (after the network started shuttering FM affiliates in the mid-2010s), WZPL had picked up the Radio Disney format for a year on the HD2 channel, until Entercom's affiliation with Disney expired.
