= WNTR =

Adult contemporary radio station in Indianapolis

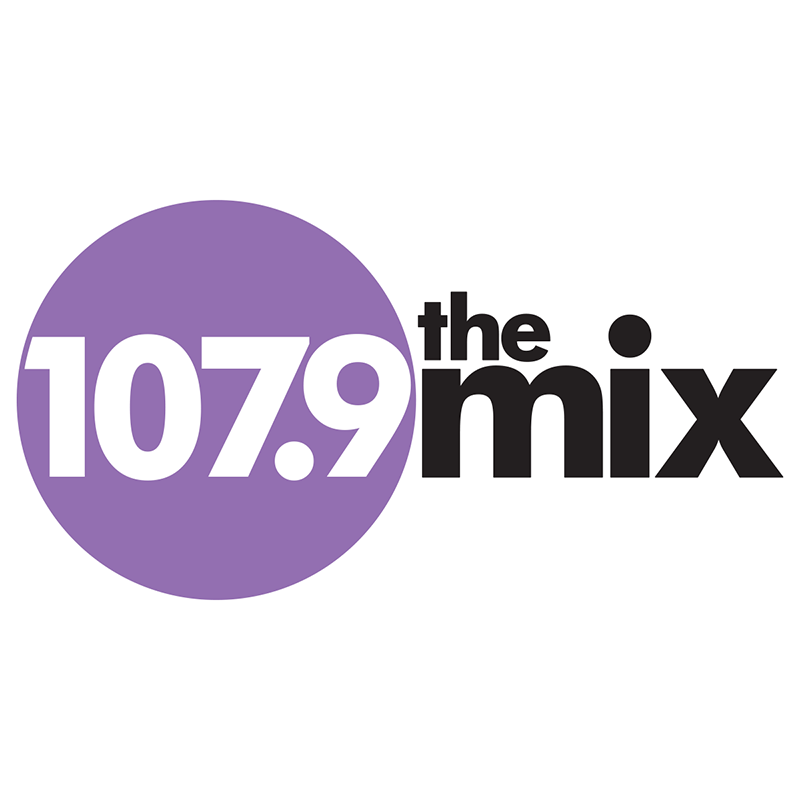
- Indianapolis, Indiana; United States
- Broadcast area: Indianapolis metropolitan area
- Frequency: 107.9 MHz (HD Radio)
- Branding: 107.9 The Mix

Programming
- Format: Adult contemporary

Ownership
- Owner: Cumulus Media; (Radio License Holding SRC LLC)
- Sister stations: WFMS, WJJK, WXNT, WNDX, WZPL

History
- First air date: October 15, 1984
- Former call signs: WTPI (1984–2005)
- Call sign meaning: Station was known as "The Track"

Technical information
- Licensing authority: FCC
- Facility ID: 47143
- Class: B
- ERP: 22,000 watts
- HAAT: 232 meters (761 ft)
- Transmitter coordinates: 39.895°N 86.201°W

Links
- Public license information: Public file; LMS
- Website: www.indysmix.com

WNTR (107.9 FM) is a commercial radio station licensed to Indianapolis, Indiana, United States. WNTR airs an adult contemporary format as "107.9 The Mix" under the ownership of Cumulus Media. Its studios are located on North Meridian Street, and its transmitter tower is on the northwest side.

== Prior use of 107.9 FM in Indianapolis ==
Indiana Broadcasting Company was granted a construction permit to build a new radio station on 107.9 FM in Indianapolis on July 21, 1960. The station went on air October 22, 1961, as WISH-FM, a sister station to WISH (1310 AM) and WISH-TV (channel 8). In November 1963, owner Corinthian Broadcasting opted to focus on its television stations and sold the WISH radio stations to the Star Stations group, headed by Don Burden. Under Burden, WISH-AM-FM became WIFE-AM-FM. Lucky 13 WIFE was a Top 40 dynasty into the 1970s, while the FM operation was an automated beautiful music station.

However, Burden ran afoul of the Federal Communications Commission for a number of serious violations, some of them concerning the Indianapolis operation, and the FCC ruled to deny license renewals to all Star Stations in 1975. After the exhaustion of all appeals, the transfer of the AM station to a competing applicant, and a short-lived flip to country as "CB-108" in the final months, WIFE-FM left the air on September 2, 1976.

== History ==
=== WTPI ===
Even before WIFE-FM had signed off, applicants formed to make bids on the vacant 107.9 MHz frequency. After receiving nine applications by the November 1976 cut-off date, In 1978, the FCC designated five bids for comparative hearing, from Peoples Broadcasting Corporation; Radio Circle City, headed by former WIFE-AM-FM general manager Robert Kiley; Mediacom; Radio Corporation of Indiana, consisting of several local investors; and Indianapolis Communications Corporation.

The FCC did not rule in favor of any of the applications until May 1982, when it selected Peoples. However, the winning applicant had developed a flaw in the intervening years, as Peoples head Joseph Cantor died in September 1981. FCC rules which froze the qualifications of competing applicants at a certain point in time meant that the two ruling administrative law judges had to consider Peoples as if Cantor was still alive. The losing bidders appealed, but the FCC review board and the full commission upheld the decision.

On October 15, 1984, Peoples Broadcasting went on the air by using the new call letters WTPI which is short for "We're at the Top for Indianapolis!", relating to their location at the top of the Indianapolis FM dial. The first program director at WTPI was Mark Edwards, and the station's new studios overlooked Monument Circle in downtown Indianapolis. Longtime morning personality Steve Cooper (a.k.a. Jim Carr) was with the station for its entire lifetime. Cooper also did stints at WNDE (1260 AM) and at WIFE. Overnights were handled by Mike O'Brien (a.k.a. Dave Heck, now an engineer at Emmis Radio) for nearly 20 years. The station was known for "Night Breeze", a nightly light AC and Jazz show in the 1990s. Over the years, WTPI was the radio home of Jennifer Carr, Paul Poteet, Oleta Martin, Pat Moore, Jerry Curtis, Gia Berns, and Kelli Jack, to name a few.

WTPI was sold twice in the 1980s. In 1986, original owner Peoples sold the station for $8.5 million to the Somerset Group, a local firm. Three years later, the Pinnacle Group—renamed MyStar Communications in 1990—acquired WTPI for $12 million. The radio station eventually moved from Monument Circle to the 3100 block of North Meridian Street, and finally to its current site at 9245 North Meridian.

=== Recent history ===
On October 3, 2005, Entercom dropped the adult contemporary music format in favor of adult hits, and changed the call letters to WNTR. The station's on-air identifier was "107.9 The Track". Programming featured a somewhat "Jack-like" format proclaiming "We Play Everything." A popular live syndicated show featuring Tom Kent occupied the evening shift on WNTR. They also broadcast American Top 40 The 1980s with Casey Kasem on Saturday at 6:00 a.m. and also on Sunday at 8:00 a.m.

On November 13, 2009, WNTR began stunting with Christmas music with a format flip coming after Christmas Day. On December 28, 2009, at 12:28 p.m., WNTR was rebranded as "My 107.9", retaining the adult hits format. The first song on "My" was "Don't Stop Believin'" by Journey.

On May 22, 2013, at 5 p.m., after playing Kesha's "Blow", and a goodbye message, followed by Simple Minds' "Don't You (Forget About Me)", WNTR began stunting with micro-formats (Rock as Rock 107.9, all Garth Brooks as Garth 107.9, Christmas music as Yule 107.9, all boy bands as Heartthrob 107.9, all Midwestern-born artists as 107.9 Heartland Radio, and sounds of nature as Earth 107.9). The following day at 5 p.m., a Hot AC format was introduced under the name "107.9 The Mix", with Dave Smiley from sister station WZPL launching the station with Fall Out Boy's "My Songs Know What You Did in the Dark (Light Em Up)".

On February 13, 2019, Cumulus Media and Entercom announced an agreement in which WNTR, WXNT, and WZPL would be swapped to Cumulus in exchange for WNSH (now WXBK) in New York City and WHLL and WMAS-FM in Springfield, Massachusetts. Under the terms of the deal, Cumulus began operating WNTR under a local marketing agreement on March 1, 2019. The swap was completed on May 9, 2019.

On April 10, 2020, WNTR dropped its hot AC format and began stunting with Christmas music again. The stunting was framed as a form of escapism in response to the global uncertainly brought on by the COVID-19 Pandemic. On May 14, 2020, WNTR ended its Christmas music stunt and shifted back to adult contemporary, still branded as "107.9 The Mix".

== HD Radio ==
WNTR is licensed to broadcast in the HD Radio format.
