= I94 =

I-94 is the northernmost east–west Interstate Highway connecting the Great Lakes and Intermountain regions of the United States.

I-94, i94, or I94 may also refer to:

- Form I-94, a form denoting the Arrival-Departure Record of particular aliens used by U.S. Customs and Border Protection
- I-94, a 1974 film by independent filmmaker James Benning
- i94, former branding of the Lawrence, Indiana mainstream rock station WNDX
- I-94, former branding of Honolulu rhythmic contemporary radio station KUBT (93.9FM)
