= Hilltop Farm =

- U.S. National Register of Historic Places
- U.S. Historic district
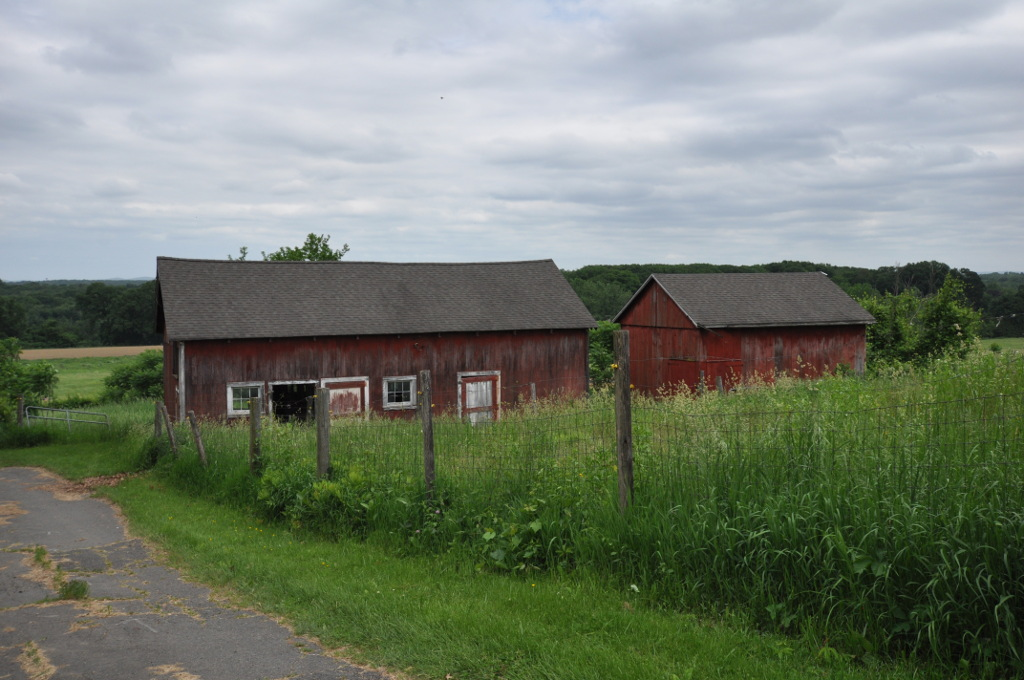

- Location within Connecticut Location within the United States
- Location: 1550-1760 Mapleton Avenue, Suffield, Connecticut
- Coordinates: 42°1′25″N 72°37′1.1″W
- Area: 236 acres (96 ha)
- Built: 1913
- Architect: Westhoff, Max; et.al.
- Architectural style: Late 19th And 20th Century Revivals, Mid 19th Century Revival
- NRHP reference No.: 04001463
- Added to NRHP: January 12, 2005

Hilltop Farm is a historic country estate and gentleman's farm on Mapleton Avenue in northern Suffield, Connecticut. It was established in 1913 by George M. Hendee, one of the founders of the Indian Motorcycle Manufacturing Company, one of the nation's first motorcycle makers. Although its manor house was demolished in 1961, the estate retains many buildings built for Hendee, as well as a cluster of older farm buildings that he retained. The farm was listed as a historic district on the National Register of Historic Places in 2005.

== Description and history ==
The Hilltop Farm complex occupies over 230 acres (93 ha) of land in the northeast corner of Suffield, most of which lies between Mapleton Avenue (Connecticut Route 159) and the Connecticut River. The southern portions of the property include three clusters of farm buildings, each with a house. The main cluster, roughly east of Hickory Street, includes a large dairy barn and chicken house, as well as a tobacco barn and numerous smaller buildings, with two small period residences, and a later house built on the site of the original manor house. To the south of this cluster lie two smaller groups, originally the farmsteads of the Stroh and Sikes families from whom George Hendee purchased the land. North of the main cluster is a mid-20th century institutional campus that (as of 2017) stands vacant.

George Hendee was a native of nearby Springfield, Massachusetts, who was initially engaged in the manufacture of bicycles. In 1898 he began producing motorcycles under the "Indian" nameplate, which met with great success and made him extremely wealthy. In 1913 he began purchasing farmland in northeastern Suffield, on which he established a gentleman's farm that was primarily focused on dairy operations. Hendee remained involved in this pursuit, withdrawing from Indian Motorcycle in 1915, until ill health prompted him to leave the estate in 1938 and sell it in 1940. It was then subdivided, portions of the estate repurposed, and his main house demolished in 1961. The estate retains many original features, including landscaping by Carl Rust Parker. The surviving farm-related portion of the estate is now owned by the town and maintained by a local nonprofit group.

== See also ==
- National Register of Historic Places listings in Hartford County, Connecticut
