= WXNT =

CBS Sports Radio affiliate in Indianapolis

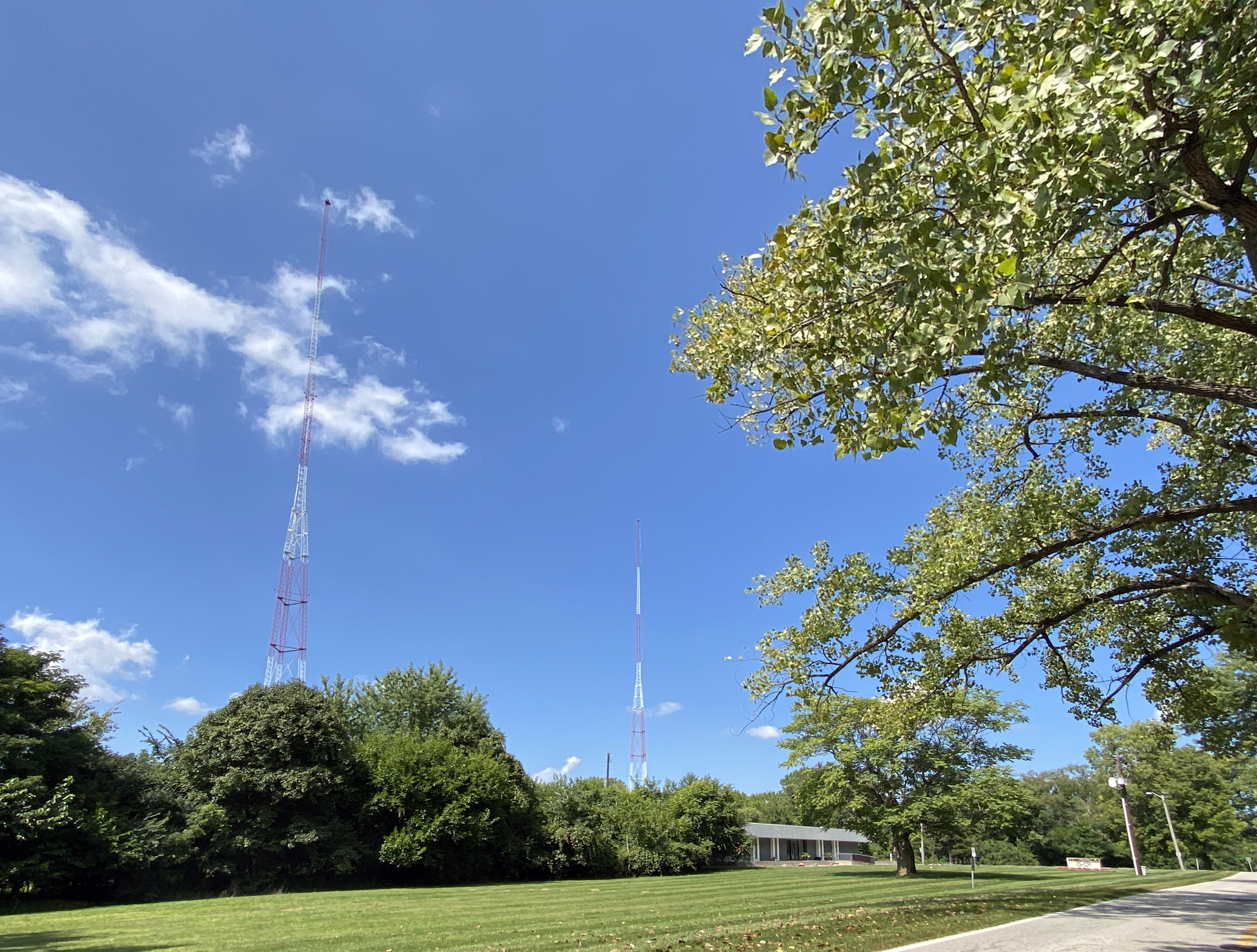
- Indianapolis, Indiana; United States
- Broadcast area: Indianapolis metropolitan area
- Frequency: 1430 kHz
- Branding: Indy's Sports Ticket 1430

Programming
- Format: Sports radio
- Affiliations: Westwood One Sports

Ownership
- Owner: Cumulus Media; (Radio License Holding SRC LLC)
- Sister stations: WFMS; WJJK; WNTR; WNDX; WZPL

History
- First air date: November 29, 1926; 99 years ago
- Former call signs: WKBF (1926–1935); WIRE (1935–1989); WXTZ (1989–1990); WFXF (1990–1992); WCKN (1992–1994); WMYS (1994–2001)
- Former frequencies: 1400 kHz (1926–1941)
- Call sign meaning: X (Crossroads of America) News/Talk (previous format)

Technical information
- Licensing authority: FCC
- Facility ID: 47145
- Class: B
- Power: 5,000 watts
- Transmitter coordinates: 39°50′18″N 86°11′55.1″W
- Repeater: 99.5 WZPL-HD2 (Greenfield)

Links
- Public license information: Public file; LMS
- Webcast: Listen live
- Website: www.indysportsticket.com

WXNT (1430 AM) is a commercial radio station in Indianapolis, Indiana. The station is owned by Cumulus Media, and carries a sports radio format, as an affiliate of Westwood One Sports. WXNT's schedule consists of Westwood One Sports network shows and live sporting events.

WXNT's studio is located on North Shadeland Avenue on the city's east side, along with sister stations 99.5 WZPL, 107.9 WNTR and other stations in the Cumulus Indianapolis cluster. The transmitter and antenna are located off Knollton Road at West 46th Street, on the northwest side of Indianapolis. WXNT operates at 5,000 watts around the clock, using a non-directional antenna by day. But at night a directional antenna is required to protect other stations on AM 1430 from interference.

== History ==
WXNT first signed on as WKBF in 1926 at 1400 kHz. Eleven years later, the station changed its call sign to WIRE, as announced by the Federal Communications Commission on March 16, 1935. In 1941, the station moved to its current dial position at 1430 kHz, when the North American Regional Broadcasting Agreement or NARBA required many AM stations to change their frequencies.

The station was mentioned as officially opening its new studios on the show "Nightbeat" on October 27, 1950. For most of the 1960s, '70s and '80s, its programming consisted of country music, which proved an enormous ratings success. In 1970, WIRE's country format was number one in the Indianapolis radio market with a 25.6 Pulse rating share, also making it the highest-rated country station in the nation, according to a 1970 Billboard magazine article. But over time, country music fans shifted their listening to FM radio.

When Mid America Radio flipped WXTZ (103.3 FM) from easy listening to adult contemporary in 1989, the format and call sign moved to AM.

On November 28, 1990, the station became WFXF, which simulcast then-sister station WFXF-FM 103.3 and its classic rock format known as "103.3 The Fox." (Today that station is alternative rock/active rock WOLT). On May 18, 1992, the call sign for AM 1430 was changed to WCKN.

WXNT's logo as a news/talk station

On September 8, 1994, the station switched to a syndicated adult standards format known as "The Music of Your Life," using the call sign WMYS. The station also aired Indianapolis Ice hockey games and Indiana Twisters indoor soccer games. On October 22, 2001, the station changed its call sign to WXNT, with the NT standing for News/Talk, its new format. WXNT would broadcast Notre Dame Fighting Irish football and previously broadcast Butler University basketball.

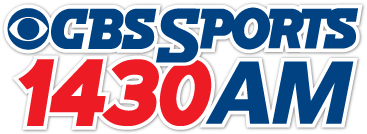
WXNT's first logo as "CBS Sports 1430 AM"

On January 2, 2013, WXNT switched to all-sports, becoming a CBS Sports Radio Network affiliate. The station continues to be the Indianapolis home for Notre Dame football.

On February 13, 2019, Cumulus Media and Entercom announced an agreement in which WXNT, WZPL, and WNTR would be swapped to Cumulus in exchange for WNSH (now WXBK) in New York City and WHLL and WMAS-FM in Springfield, Massachusetts. Under the terms of the deal, Cumulus began operating WXNT under a local marketing agreement on March 1, 2019. The swap was completed on May 9, 2019.

On November 30, 2023, WXNT rebranded as "Indy's Sports Ticket 1430".
