= Gothic Cottage =

Gothic Cottage may refer to

- Carpenter Gothic, the architectural style, or an example of that style applied to a cottage
- Gothic Cottage (Suffield, Connecticut), listed on the NRHP in Hartford County, Connecticut
- William J. Rotch Gothic Cottage, New Bedford, Massachusetts, NRHP-listed
- John Wesley Mason Gothic Cottage, Braceville, Ohio, listed on the NRHP in Trumbull County, Ohio
- Charles Brown Gothic Cottage, North Bloomfield, Ohio, listed on the NRHP in Trumbull County, Ohio
