= Chris Kellogg =

American actor

Chris Kellogg (born May 11, 1972) is an American morning radio host, and a party and wedding DJ. In November, 2013, he was named top air personality for Massachusetts, for the WMAS-FM Kellogg Krew morning show by the Massachusetts Broadcasters Association.

== Early life and education ==
Kellogg grew up in Suffield, Connecticut, and moved to eight different states hosting radio morning shows. He attended Suffield High School, then went to Ithaca College in Ithaca, New York, where he attended the Roy H. Park school of communications and majored in communication studies.

While he was a college student in Ithaca, Kellogg became a part-time radio DJ at the college radio station, WICB. Upon graduation, he earned a night shift at WNKI, Wink 106, in Corning, New York. He hosted his first full-time morning show a year later in Tupelo, Mississippi, at WWKZ.

Kellogg is currently the morning host of The Kellogg Krew on 94.7 WMAS in Springfield, Massachusetts.

== Career ==
=== The Kellogg Krew morning show ===
While he was working at WCTZ-FM in Norwalk, Connecticut, Kellogg was hired by Citadel Broadcasting after a nationwide search for a new host in 2007. The Kellogg Krew morning show started on October 15, 2007, with co-hosts Dina McMahon and producer Lopez.

Kellogg has interviewed many celebrities, including Bill Clinton, Martin Short, and an interview with Candy Spelling that was featured on Entertainment Tonight, and The Insider. Kellogg was the first radio host to interview Carrie Underwood after she won Season 4 of American Idol.

=== TopWeddingDay.com ===
Kellogg is the owner and editor-in-chief of the wedding idea website TopWeddingDay.com.

=== Voiceover work ===
Kellogg had a short voiceover role in the film Return to Sender, as a radio host. He was included in a scene with Aidan Quinn. The movie co-starred Kelly Preston and Tim Daly.

== Personal life ==
Kellogg is involved with various charities, including the Children's Miracle Network. He has been involved with the organization since 2007. He is the radio host for the Children's Miracle Network radiothon, which is held each year at Baystate Medical Center in Springfield, Massachusetts.

Kellogg was the 2011 M.C. for Geno Auriemma's Fore the Kids Charity Golf Tournament, which benefits Connecticut Children's Medical Center.

Kellogg was married on March 15, 2011, in Jamaica. He has two stepchildren, in addition to Olivia, born March 20, 2012. He and his family live in Chicopee, Massachusetts.
