= WXTZ =

WXTZ may refer to:

- WXTZ-LP, a low-power radio station (103.3 FM) licensed to serve Yadkinville, North Carolina, United States
- WNDX, a radio station (93.9 FM) licensed to serve Lawrence, Indiana, United States, which held the call sign WXTZ from 1993 to 1996
