= History of slavery in Connecticut =

The exact date of the first African slaves in Connecticut is unknown, but the narrative of Venture Smith provides some information about the life of northern slavery in Connecticut. Another early confirmed account of slavery in the English colony came in 1638 when several native prisoners were taken during the Pequot War were exchanged in the West Indies for African slaves. Such exchanges become common in subsequent conflicts.

== Legal history of abolition in Connecticut ==
Connecticut blocked the importation of slaves in 1774, via the passage in the state legislature of the "Act for Prohibiting the Importation of Indian, Negro or Molatto Slaves" and began a gradual emancipation of slaves in 1784, through the passage by the state legislature of the "Gradual Abolition Act" of that year. Through this "freeing the womb" act, all slaves born after March 1, 1784, would become free upon attaining the age of 25 for men and 21 for women, though it did not free the parents, or any other adult slaves.

=== 1848 slavery abolition ===
In 1844, Governor Roger Sherman Baldwin proposed legislation to end slavery, but the General Assembly did not pass it until it was reintroduced in 1848 as "An Act to Prevent Slavery". The last person held as a slave in Connecticut, Nancy Toney of Windsor, died in December 1857; she had been considered a free woman since 1830 or earlier.

Lieutenant Thomas R. Gedney steered La Amistad into Connecticut as opposed to the state of New York in 1839 because at the time slavery was still legal in Connecticut.

=== Nancy Toney of Windsor (1774 – December 19, 1857) ===
Nancy was baptized on November 27, 1774, probably as an infant, in Christ's Church. Abigail Sherwood Chaffee Loomis inherited Nancy from Dr. Chaffee Jr. after his death in 1821. His will, dated 1818, specifically bequeathed "to my Daughter Abigail S. Loomis, wife of Col. James Loomis...my negro slave Nance." In the 1830 federal census, Nancy is surprisingly listed as a "free colored female". No extant Windsor records prove Nancy's freedom as it is categorized in the federal census; therefore, it is possible that the Loomis family began labeling Nancy as a free person without actually granting her freedom. The 1850 US Census, the first to name residents other than the head of household, listed Nancy, a 72-year-old free black woman, residing with James and Abigail Loomis.

== Prevalence of slavery ==
According to Anne Farrow, Joel Lang, and Jenifer Frank, "In 1790 most prosperous merchants in Connecticut owned at least one slave, as did 50 percent of the ministers. ...Our economic links to slavery were deeply entwined with our religious, political, and educational institutions. Slavery was part of the social contract in Connecticut."

According to U.S. census data there were 2,764 slaves in Connecticut as of 1790, a little over 1% of the population at the time. This declined during the early part of the 19th century, with the census indicating numbers (percentages) reported as slaves in the State of 951 (.34%) in 1800, 97 (.04%) in 1820 and 25 (.008%) by 1830.

== Laws ==
The first recorded law in Connecticut in regard to slavery is from December 1, 1642. It is listed as the tenth law of the Capital Laws of Connecticut and states, "If any man stealeth a man or mankind, he shall be put to death." This law was understood in those times to only pertain to those of the white race.

Connecticut's black code began in October, 1690. This code included laws targeting those labeled as a "negro, mulatto, or Indian servant."

== Court cases ==
=== 1700s ===
One of the earliest Connecticut court dates involving an enslaved man named Abda, dates back to the early 1700s. The case centers around an enslaved man named Abda, who was a multiracial person. The court detailed how Abda escaped from his master, Captain Thomas Richards of Hartford, Connecticut. Abda was tried in court. Abda countered any claims of wrongdoing by claiming twenty dollars' worth of damages from Richards. The County Court determined on February 25 that Abda would be granted twelve dollars. The verdict was that Abda was able to gain freedom on behalf of his white heritage.

An enslaved woman named Hagar of New London asked the Governor and Council for freedom for her and her children from their former master, James Rogers. The courts warranted this, thereby allowing her to also refuse herself as a slave to Rogers' grandson, James Rogers Jr.

Legal debates about slavery continued, as seen in the 1788 case of Pettis v. Warren. In this case, a black slave sued for his freedom, and a juror was challenged for holding the opinion that "no negro, by the laws of this state, could be holden a slave." The Connecticut Supreme Court upheld the trial court's overruling of the challenge, stating that an opinion on a general principle of law did not disqualify a juror. The court emphasized that jurors were expected to have knowledge of the law since they served as "judges of law as well as fact."

== New London's role in slave trade ==
New London, Connecticut and its waters played a large role in slave trade. Up to 40 ships harbored in New London's waters have been recorded to have played a part in the trading of enslaved people. The schooner Speedwell is the only ship known to have arrived in New London from West Africa, carrying enslaved individuals.

Samuel Gould ran a slave trading business in New London. His records include evidence of three ships that traveled to West Africa from New London with the intent of capturing individuals to enslave them.

The Saltonsall family of New London, descendents of New London's founder John Winthrop, are documented to have owned enslaved individuals. Dudley Saltonsall alone was responsible for the capture of more than 63,000 enslaved people brought from Africa.

=== Schooner Speedwell ===
A schooner named Speedwell arrived in New London, Connecticut on July 17, 1761 carrying 74 Africans who had been taken captive in West Africa. The schooner initially left West Africa carrying 95 Africans. 21 of those taken captive did not survive the journey. The Speedwell is the only known ship to have arrived in New London from West Africa carrying enslaved individuals. One of the Speedwell's owners was Normand Morison from Bolton, Connecticut.

Some of the captives that arrived on the Speedwell were sold into slavery right in New London. The rest of the African captives were sold into slavery in Middletown, Connecticut. Some were also sold onto a farm in Bolton, Connecticut, owned by Normand Morison.

==== The Speedwell's journey ====
The Speedwell arrived in New London, Connecticut on July 17, 1761 from West Africa. The Speedwell harbored in New London for a few days while some of its captured passengers were sold into slavery. The Speedwell then sailed to Middletown, Connecticut via the Connecticut River, where the remaining captured Africans aboard the ship were sold into slavery.

== The Browne lands ==
In 1720, Colonel Samuel Browne founded what is now known as the town of Salem, Connecticut, named after the location of their other house residing in Salem, Massachusetts. Browne purchased land in Eastern Connecticut, totaling to at least 9,600 acres. James Harris sold Browne most of that land.

=== The Browne plantation ===
Information has been spread that the Browne family owned a slave plantation with 50-60 slaves in what is now known as Salem, Connecticut. There is no source that can prove this claim to be entirely true. In 2001, archaeologists dug up what they believed to be remnants of the Browne slave plantation. Historian Bruce P. Stark has questioned the accuracy of what archaeologists claim to have discovered, due to their lack of knowledge on the history of slavery and the lack of primary sources to support their findings.

==== The Browne lands today ====
One of Browne's houses, the Mumford house on White Birch Road, still remains today. The house is currently owned by descendants of the last overseers of the Browne plantation. The majority of the former Browne lands can be found near today's Salem Valley Farms ice cream shop.

=== Enslaved individuals of the Browne family ===
The following persons were enslaved by the Browne family:

- Jimm
- Rose
- Cato
- Phillis
- Cesar
- Little Prince
- Great Prince
- Luke
- Prue
- Pomp
- Old Fashion
- Paddy

== See also ==
- Andrew T. Judson
- Canterbury Female Boarding School
- James Mars
- Nero Hawley
- New Haven Excitement (Simeon Jocelyn)
- Samuel Joseph May
- Titus Gay aka Old Ti
- Titus Kent
