= Slavery in pre-Columbian America =

Slavery was widely practiced by the Indigenous peoples of the Americas, both prior to European colonization and subsequently.

Slavery and related practices of forced labor varied greatly between regions and over time. In some instances, traditional practices may have continued after European colonization.

== North America ==
Slaves were traded across trans-continental trade networks in North America before European arrival.

Many of the Indigenous peoples of the Pacific Northwest Coast, such as the Haida and Tlingit, were traditionally known as fierce warriors and slave-traders, raiding as far south as California. Slavery was hereditary, the slaves being prisoners of war. Their targets often included members of the Coast Salish groups. Among some tribes about a quarter of the population were slaves.

The Pawnee of the Great Plains, the Haudenosaunee of the state of New York, and the Yurok and Klamath of California, were known to keep slaves.

== Mesoamerica and Caribbean ==
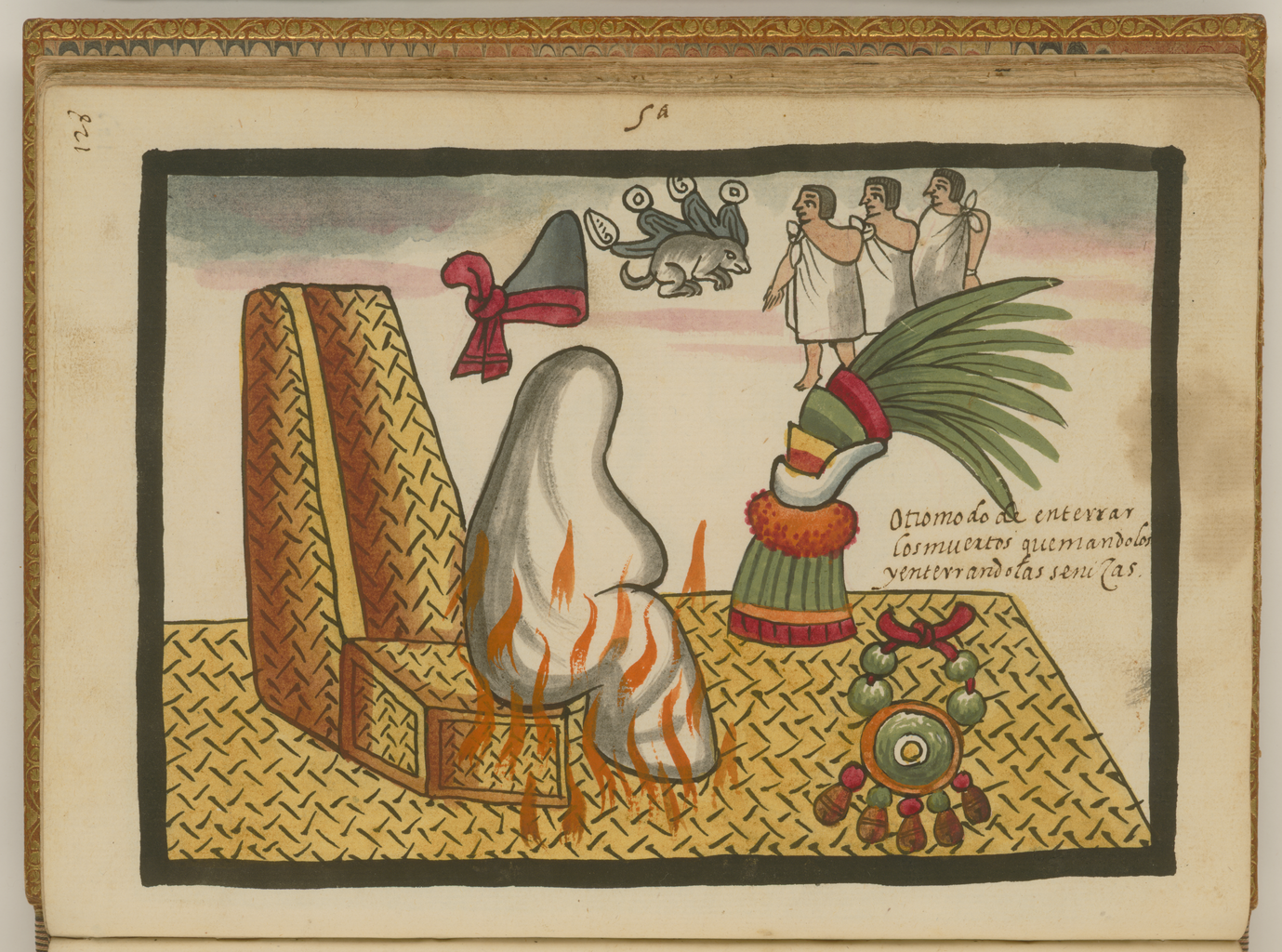
In this illustration from the Ramírez Codex, the three men in the background represent slaves who were sacrificed as part of the funeral rites for the Aztec Emperor Auitzotl.

In Mesoamerica, the most common forms of slavery were those of prisoners of war and debtors. People unable to pay back debts could be sentenced to work as slaves to the persons owed until the debts were worked off. Enslavement was also a possible sentence for the crimes of thievery, rape and poaching.

The Mayan and Aztec civilizations both practiced slavery. Warfare was important to Maya society, because raids on surrounding areas provided the victims required for human sacrifice, as well as slaves for the construction of temples. Among the Maya, slavery was inherited, unless a ransom was paid. Most victims of human sacrifice were prisoners of war or slaves. Among the Aztecs, white collar crime such as embezzlement, breach of trust, and theft could be penalized with enslavement. The Nahuas traded child slaves.

The Kalinago of Dominica were known to keep slaves.

== South America ==
In the Inca Empire, workers were subject to a mit'a in lieu of taxes which they paid by working for the government, a form of corvée labor. Each ayllu, or extended family, would decide which family member to send to do the work. It is debated whether this system of forced labor counts as slavery.

The Arawak, Caribs, Waraos, and Akawaio of Dutch Guiana captured people from other tribes. Most males were executed, but some were enslaved or sold repeatedly, often across great distances.

The Tehuelche of Patagonia, and the Tupinambá of Brazil, were known to keep slaves.

== See also ==
- Female slavery in the United States
- History of labor law in the United States
- History of slavery in Connecticut
- History of slavery in Florida
- History of slavery in Georgia
- History of slavery in Maryland
- History of slavery in Massachusetts
- History of slavery in New Jersey
- History of slavery in New York
- History of slavery in Pennsylvania
- History of slavery in Rhode Island
- History of slavery in Virginia
