= George Hendee =

George Hendee may refer to:

- George M. Hendee (1866–1943), co-founder of the Indian Motocycle Manufacturing Company
- George Whitman Hendee (1832–1906), U.S. Representative from Vermont
