= Robert Pattison =

Robert Pattison may refer to:

- Robert E. Pattison (1850–1904), governor of Pennsylvania
- Robert Everett Pattison (1800–1874), American clergyman and president of Colby College

== See also ==
- Robert Pattinson
