= The Smiley Morning Show =

American radio program

- Genre: Entertainment, Talk, Music
- Running time: Mon - Fri, 5 - 10 a.m. (EST)
- Country of origin: United States
- Home station: WZPL, 99.5 FM
- Starring: Dave Smiley; Nikki Reed; Toni Williams
- Produced by: Will Pfaffenberger
- Original release: 2002 – present
- Website: http://www.wzpl.com

The Smiley Morning Show is a morning radio program on radio station WZPL (99.5 FM - a Cumulus Media station) broadcasting from Indianapolis, Indiana. The show first aired in 2002 and is hosted by radio personality Dave Smiley and co-hosts Nikki Reed, Toni Williams, and Producer Will.

The show is a talk/entertainment morning show that includes significant interaction with listeners. Each morning features Dave Smiley making various comments about the upcoming day, and features guest interviews with local Indiana celebrities, actors, comedians and musicians.

== Cast ==
- Dave Smiley – Host of the show since 2002. Originally from Pella, Iowa where he started in radio as a teen at Valley High School's KWDM radio station. Smiley moved to the Indianapolis area in May 2002 after stints in New York, San Diego, California and Phoenix, Arizona. Smiley proposed to his girlfriend Sarah Brown on January 7, 2012, and is now married to her. They welcomed their first child, Noah, in 2014. Smiley loves to travel and is a huge fan of The Dave Matthews Band. His second son, Austin, was born in 2017.
- Nikki Reed – Originally interned at WZPL her senior year in college under afternoon host Kelly McKay before eventually taking over the slot as the afternoon DJ for the station. 4 years later she got the call to set her alarm a little earlier and move to the Smiley Morning Show in 2015. A Michigan native, Nikki moved to Indianapolis in 2003 to attend college at the University of Indianapolis and graduated with a degree in Theater and a concentration in radio.
- Toni Williams DeKeyser – Also known as "Helper Toni", she has been at the station longer than anyone else on the show. She started working for WZPL in 2001 as the Promotion Assistant for the station. Following that job she moved up to Promotions Director of WZPL and was eventually named the Marketing Director for WZPL. WNTR, and WXNT. In 2011 Toni was called up to the Smiley Morning Show to not only get the crew in line but also add a different perspective to the show. She is also responsible for many of the Smiley Morning Show's promotions, making sure they run smoothly. Toni has a son Lucas from a previous marriage who many remember as the show's weather man. In April 2017, she married Ball State alumnus David DeKeyser and gained 2 bonus children.
- Will Pfaffenberger – "Producer Will" joined the show in 2010 and has brought his talents from Comedy Improv to the show. Will's exceptional creativity brings many ridiculous games and unique songs to the Smiley Morning Show. In 2006 Will was married and in 2015 he adopted a son, Lincoln, then a few years later adopted daughter Maren, the process of which he chronicled on the Smiley Morning Show. He owns improv comedy theater, Red Curb Comedy, in Avon, IN.

== Past members ==
- Tom Berg – Smiley's original Traffic Reporter. Berg began his career in television and radio in the Army at Fort Ord, California. He later took a job as a morning show host in Knox, IN at WKVI. He died in September 2016.
- BMoore – Producer Brian "BMoore" Moore was the show's original producer. When Smiley started at WZPL, he worked in promotions. He started producing the show in his free time and eventually moved into a full-time position. Brian created the GasMan persona and was known for many stunts on the show, like "Splash into B" where listeners could drive by a huge puddle and splash him. BMoore moved to Senior Producer of Entercom Communications in 2004 and became producer of the Abdul Morning Show on Newstalk 1430 WXNT.
- Chris "Weedman" Van Sickle – Weedman started with the show as intern in 2003 as "Intern Chris" and became the producer of the show in 2004. He took care of all production aspects on the show in his 7 years with the show. He is currently the imaging director for the Smiley Morning Show and does DJ's at various bars/parties all over Indy.
- Mindy Winkler – Mindy took over as the Traffic Reporter after Tom Berg moved to afternoons at WKLU. The former Colts cheerleader was also known for being "Commander KC" on WTTV-4. She currently works at WLHK (97.1 Hank FM) as part of the Caleb and Mindy Morning Show.
- K.J. (Kari Johll) – Former Co-host of the show started out working in the programming department and was the station's Assistant Program Director. When Smiley first started, he was bored in studio and asked her to come in and hang out. In 2015 she moved to WZPL's sister station, 107.9 The Mix to host the morning show. K.J. is from Wisconsin, is married to Patrick, and loves her cats. She is dedicated to helping at animal shelters, and has a website dedicated to this pursuit: http://kjsstrays.com. Johll is also an avid fan of the Green Bay Packers.

== Segments and themes ==
- Daily news with news gathering partner WTHR anchor, Julia Moffit starts at 7, 8, 9
- Smiley's Sucky Sports (daily)
- Nikki's Quickies (daily)
- The Topic (daily)
- Lash Wednesday
- Therapy Thursday
- Free Plug Friday
- Smiley's Supertoot
- Smiley's Wiener
- Weekend Blast-Off
- Smiley Feud
- Smiley's Missed Connection Ads
- Mean Tweets
- Secret Sound
- Battle of the Burbs

== Events ==
The Smiley Morning Show is known for hosting concerts and listener-focused events. Past events have included:

- Birthday Bash
- Jingle Jam
- Smiley Prom
- Make-A-Wish Request-A-Thon

== Awards and recognition ==
- Best Radio Personality, Dave Smiley (NUVO magazine - 2004, 2005, 2006, 2007, 2008, 2009, 2010)
- Best Morning Radio Show, The Smiley Morning Show (NUVO magazine - 2003, 2007)
- Best Traffic Reporter, Tom Berg/Mindy Winkler (NUVO magazine - 2002, 2003, 2004, 2006, 2007, 2009)
- Best Weatherman, Paul Poteet (NUVO magazine - 2003, 2005, 2007, 2009)
- Best Male Radio Personality, Dave Smiley (Indianapolis Woman - 2004)
- Best Local Morning Show, Smiley Morning Show (Friday Morning Quarterback - FMQB Leaders 2006 AC/Hot AC- 2006)
