= David Newton Sheldon =

American college president (1797–1854)

President of Colby College
- In office 1843–1853
- Preceded by: Eliphaz Fay
- Succeeded by: Robert Everett Pattison

Personal details
- Born: June 26, 1807 Suffield, Connecticut
- Died: October 4, 1889 (aged 82)
- Spouse: Rachael Hobart Ripley
- Education: Williams College, Andover Newton Theological School

David Newton Sheldon (June 26, 1807 – October 4, 1889) was the fifth President of Colby College, Maine, United States from 1843–1853. He was also a pastor, missionary, and educator.

== Early life ==
Sheldon was born in Suffield, Connecticut, to David and Elizabeth Hall. He was educated at Williams College, where he graduated as the valedictorian of the class of 1830 and was inducted into Phi Beta Kappa society. He was a tutor for one year before entering the Andover Newton Theological School and graduating in 1835. He married Rachael Hobart Ripley in Chelsea, Massachusetts on October 15, 1835, with whom he ultimately had five children.

== Career ==
Sheldon was a Baptist missionary in France from 1835-1839, and a pastor in Halifax, Nova Scotia, before coming to Waterville, Maine in 1842, where he was a pastor and a French Teacher at Colby College. Beginning in 1843, he was the president of the college and Professor of Intellectual and Moral Philosophy. At least in part due to his liberal inclination towards Free Will Baptist theology, the Calvinistic Baptists who founded the college forced him out in 1853, after years of declining enrollments. He received an honorary Doctor of Divinity degree from Brown University in 1847. He held various pastorships in Bath, Maine, including as a Unitarian from 1853-1862 before returning to Waterville, where he continued as a Unitarian pastor until 1879.

Sheldon died at his home in Waterville on October 4, 1889.

== Published works ==
- Sin and Redemption, 1856
