= Titus Gay =

Former American slave

Titus Gay, who called himself Titus Kent (c. 1770 or 1779 – May 1837 or May 1838), also known as "Old Ti", was born into slavery in the town of Suffield, Connecticut, United States. Titus's father had the Kent surname. Because of the Gradual Emancipation Act passed in 1784, Titus was freed in 1812. Once freed, he continued to work for Rev. Ebenezar Gay, Jr. performing a number of duties. His presence in the lives of the townspeople made him an important member of the community. He is also remembered for his efforts to prevent local enslaved people from being sent into slavery in the South. He was buried in the Congregational church cemetery in Suffield, Connecticut.

== Background ==
The purchase of Black enslaved people began in Suffield, Connecticut in the late 1680s for construction of a mill. After that, the few people that could afford to purchase enslaved people were innkeepers, magistrates, and the town minister. In 1726, the townspeople voted to provide £20 towards the purchase of slaves for the minister.

Number of enslaved people in Suffield by year
1725	1756	1774	1782	1790	1800	1812
38	24	37	53	28	4	3

Enslaved people in Connecticut could be church members and were able to marry. Ownership generally passed through families, rather than through sales.

In 1784, the town allowed for healthy Black men and women between the ages of 25 and 45 to be released from bondage, at their owner's discretion. The three enslaved people in 1812 were owned by Rev. Ebenezar Gay. The three — Titus and his sisters Dinah, and Genny — were freed by members of the Gay family, thus ending slavery in Suffield. Dinah and Genny became paid servants after they were freed.

== Early life ==
Titus was born about 1770 or 1779. His parents were born in Africa, forcefully taken aboard a Dutch ship, and taken to the American colonies, eventually arriving in Suffield, Connecticut. They were both treated cruelly before ending up in the Kent and Gay homes. His father, an enslaved man owned by Elihu Kent, was Cato Kent. Cato served during the War of 1812, for which he was emancipated. Smith states that he was a distinguished soldier. He is reported to have lived until 1885, dying at age 120. Rose Gay, his mother, served Reverend Ebenezer Gay of Suffield. Smith states that Gay purchased her out of pity for the treatment she received by her former owner. She claimed to be an African princess, and was the reason why she had an "elaborate" tattoo on her back. Cato and Rose had several children together, but Titus was the only one who survived. He was born in Rev. Gay's household. Rose had three children who lived and were enslaved servants to Rev. Gay, including daughters Dinah and Genny.

After Titus was manumitted in 1812 by the heirs of Reverend Ebenezer Gay Jr., the town minister, he lived in Suffield as a free man.

== Personal life ==
According to Judge Smith's "Old Slave Days in Connecticut", Titus loved an enslaved woman, Phillis (Phill) Hanchett, and they intended to marry. Titus intercepted a plot to kidnap enslaved people, owned by the recently deceased Major John Hanchett (also Hanchet), who did not have much more time before they would be set free by the Gradual Emancipation Act. Preserved Hanchett, the married son of John who had settled in Maryland, thought it wasteful to let the slaves be freed in a couple of years. Instead, he could take them to Maryland where they would be enslaved for the rest of their lives or sold for more money than if they were in a Gradual Emancipation state. Preserved was determined to take the slaves from Connecticut, against his mother's stern warning, using force if he had to. According to Smith, Phill died while fleeing enslavement, a victim of a brutally cold Connecticut winter. Although Titus and Phill were never married (she died before they had the chance), this is the closest known instance in which Titus had a partner. He never had any children.

He was a good friend and lived in the same house as Lon. Pease. After his friend's death, he dug his grave and the legend is that he was stuck in it overnight after climbing in to measure that it was big enough. He became stuck and was not helped out until the morning after a nighttime rain.

== Free man ==
Titus and his two sisters were emancipated in 1812 by the Gay family in accordance with the Gradual Emancipation Act passed in 1784.

Titus assisted the pastor, Reverend Ebenezer Gay Jr., with funerals and kept the church in order. For 40 years, he worked as a sexton, gravedigger, the town's only bell ringer, and janitor at the second meetinghouse of the First Congregational Church. The townspeople could tell by his pattern of ringing the bell whether there was a wedding, church service, town meeting, fire, or other event. Titus acquired the name "Old Ti" when he took the job as sexton. He also "looked after" the town clerk in that time. He did chores for Squire Pease for board and earned money working for other town residents. Involved in the community, he was described as "lordly and dignified fond of exercising authority black as coal and when young was called good looking". He was known for spreading the town's news and for being superstitious.

Titus died in May 1837 or May 1838 in Suffield at the former home of Squire Pease. He was known throughout the area as the "Black Knight of the Bell". His funeral service was attended by black and white people of Suffield. He was remembered for being at the important days — baptisms, weddings, and funerals — of their lives. Titus was buried in the First Church cemetery.

== See also ==
- Titus Kent, an enslaved man from Suffield who fought in the Revolutionary War and, like Titus's father, also owned by the Kents
