= John Fuller House =

Historic house in Connecticut, United States

- U.S. National Register of Historic Places
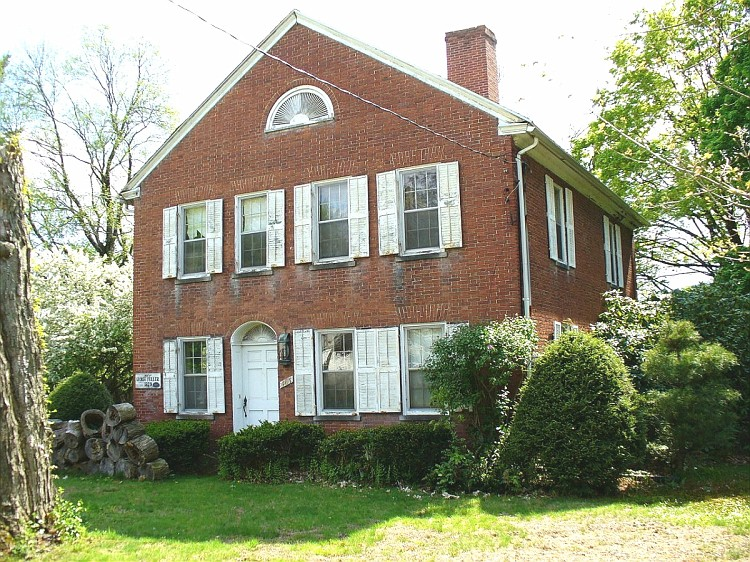

- Location within Connecticut Location within the United States
- Location: 463 Halladay Avenue, Suffield, Connecticut
- Coordinates: 42°1′3″N 72°39′27″W
- Area: 2 acres (0.81 ha)
- Built: 1824
- Built by: Fuller, George
- Architectural style: Georgian
- NRHP reference No.: 82004439
- Added to NRHP: March 15, 1982

The John Fuller House is a historic house at 463 Halladay Avenue in Suffield, Connecticut. Built in 1824, it was the main house for Suffield's town farm, its facility for supporting the poor and needy, between 1887 and 1952. It is a well-preserved example of Georgian architecture, then long out of fashion. It was listed on the National Register of Historic Places in 1982.

== Description and history ==
The John Fuller House is located in a rural area of central northern Suffield, on the west side of Halladay Avenue north of its junction with Blossom Street. It is a 2 1/2-story brick structure, with a side gable roof oriented perpendicular to the street. The main entrance is in the short street-facing facade, in the center-left bay of four. It is recessed within an opening with a rounded top, which is filled with a fanlight panel. A similar panel is found at the center of the gable above. The interior of the house has two rooms in the front, with a nearly straight-run staircase on the far right. Behind these is a single large chamber, original two that were combined by the removal of an intervening wall. Behind this is a narrow chamber running the width of the building, apparently originally used for storage. The second story roughly follows the downstairs plan. The interior retains original woodwork and some plaster.

The house was built in 1824 by George Fuller. It remained in the family until 1887, when it and the surrounding farmland were purchased by the town as a place to house its indigent population. The town had been incurring expenses since 1868 to care for the needy, and this purchase was apparently seen as a long-term cost reduction measure. Use of the farm declined beginning in the 1920s, and with expenses mounting, the town sold the property back into private ownership in 1952.

== See also ==
- National Register of Historic Places listings in Hartford County, Connecticut
