= Judson Worthington Hastings =

American physician

Judson Worthington Hastings, born on June 13, 1853, in Suffield, Connecticut, and died in 1923, was a physician and public official. He served various roles as a physician, trustee of a public library, town clerk, treasurer, tax collector, and a medical inspector of schools. Judson was a part of the Massachusetts Medical Society.
