= Eliphaz Fay =

American college president (1797–1854)

Fourth President of Colby College
- In office 1841–1843
- Preceded by: Robert Everett Pattison
- Succeeded by: David Newton Sheldon

Personal details
- Born: April 27, 1797 Marlborough, Massachusetts
- Died: March 19, 1854 (aged 56) Poughkeepsie, New York
- Spouse: Mary Helen Lee (m. 1829)
- Education: Brown University

Eliphaz Fay (April 27, 1797 – March 19, 1854) served as the fourth president of Colby College (then called the Waterville College) in Maine.

== Personal life ==
Fay was born to Solomon Fay, and Suzannah Morse, a schoolteacher in Marlborough, Massachusetts. Graduated from Brown University in 1821. He married Mary Helen (Lee) on April 20, 1829. His children were Susan Mary, William Wirt, Henry Harrison, Caroline Louise.

== Work ==
Fay had a career as a lawyer. In 1832 he was the first principal of New Paltz Academy. From 1833-1834 he published The Independence, a newspaper in Poughkeepsie, New York, which "advocate(d) the cause of Anti-Masonry, literature, science, temperance, morality and religion." Editor: Eliphaz Fay, 1832-1834.

Elected President of Colby College in August 1841, after a year when the college had no president for the prior year. The enrollment was 76.
