= Suffield, Connecticut =

- Town
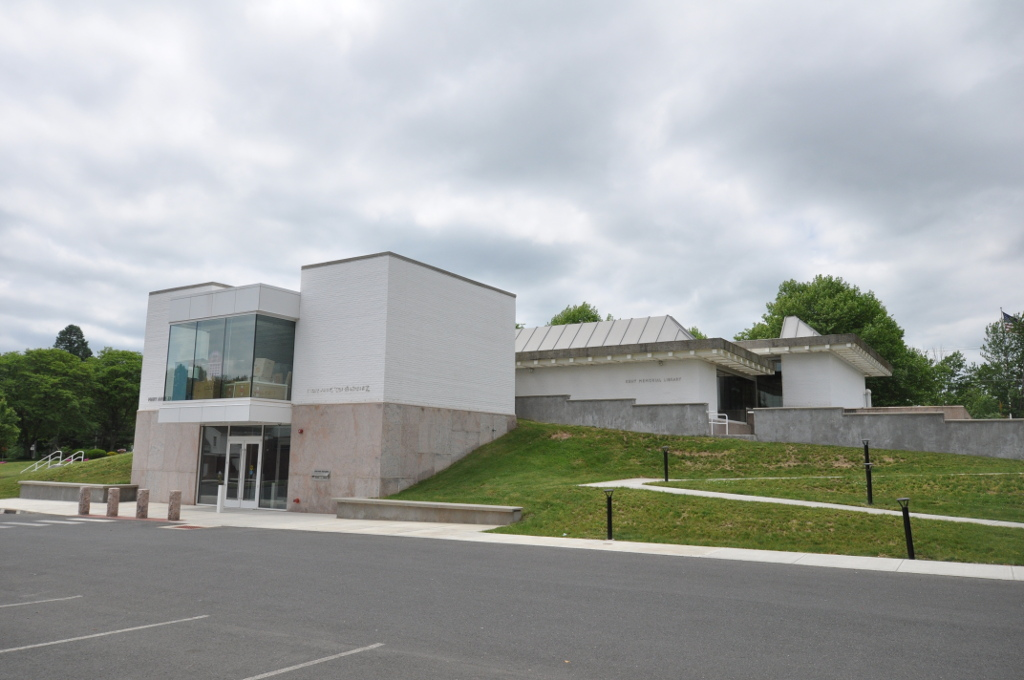
- The Suffield Public Library

- Seal
- Motto: "Our Roots Run Deep"
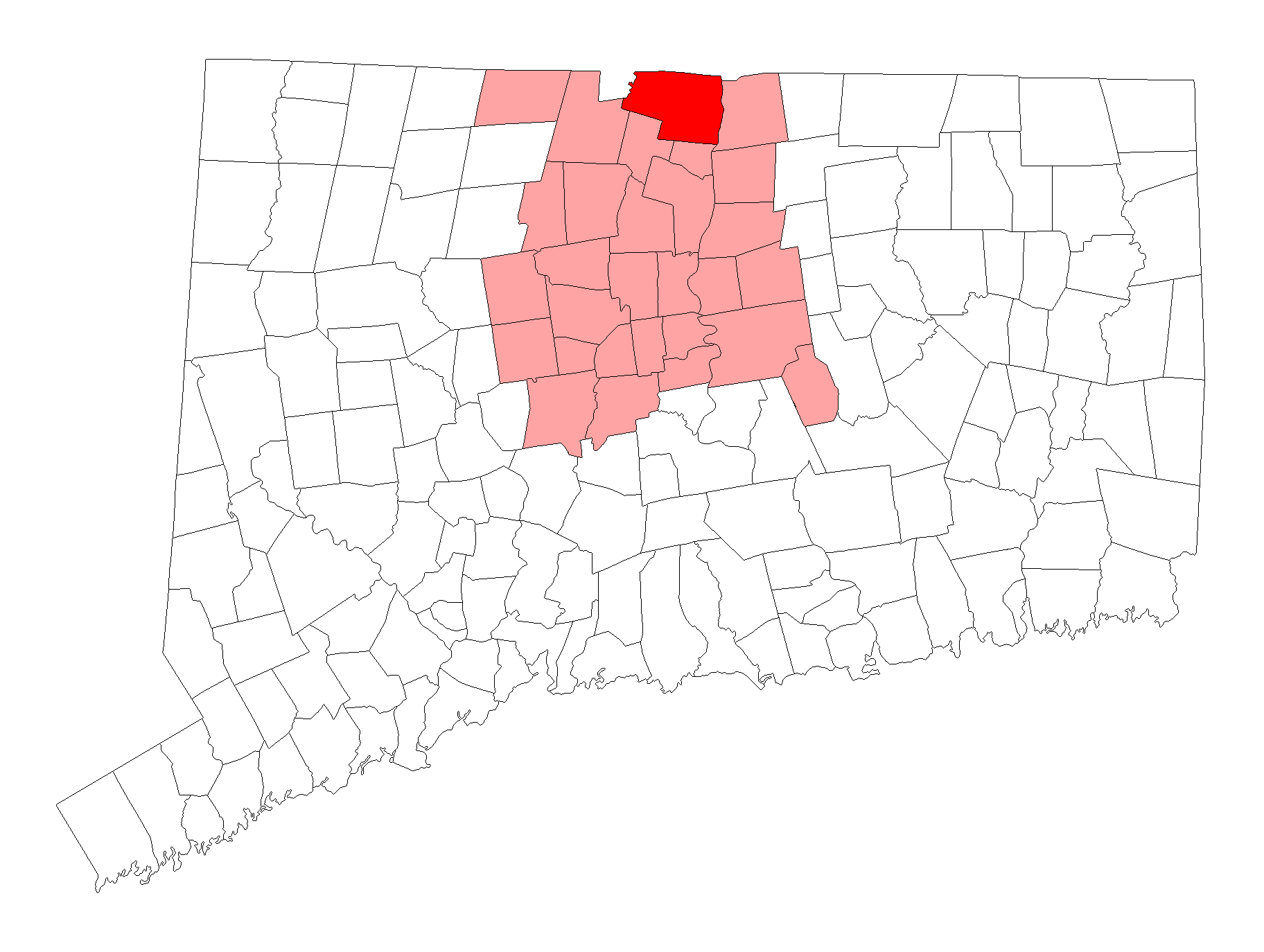
- Coordinates: 41°59′N 72°41′W
- Country: United States
- U.S. state: Connecticut
- County: Hartford
- Region: Capitol Region
- Settled: 1670
- Incorporated (Massachusetts): June 8, 1674
- Annexed by Connecticut: 1749

Government
  - Type: Selectman-town meeting
  - First selectman: Colin Moll (R)
  - Selectmen: Jeremiah Mahoney (R); Kathleen Harrington (R); Peter Hill (D); Mel Chafetz (D)

Area
  - Total: 42.9 sq mi (111.2 km^{2})
  - Land: 42.3 sq mi (109.5 km^{2})
  - Water: 0.69 sq mi (1.8 km^{2})
- Elevation: 200 ft (60 m)

Population (2020)
  - Total: 15,752
  - Density: 372.6/sq mi (143.9/km^{2})
- Time zone: UTC−5 (Eastern)
  - Summer (DST): UTC−4 (Eastern)
- ZIP Codes: 06078, 06093
- Area codes: 860/959
- FIPS code: 09-74540
- GNIS feature ID: 0212351
- Website: www.suffieldct.gov

Suffield is a town in Hartford County, Connecticut, United States. The town is part of the Capitol Planning Region, and located in the Connecticut River Valley. As of the 2020 census, the population was 15,752. The town center is a census-designated place listed as Suffield Depot.

Bordering Massachusetts, Suffield is part of the Springfield, Massachusetts NECTA. It was once within the boundaries of Massachusetts.

== History ==
Originally known as Southfield—pronounced "Suffield," on May 20, 1674, the committee for the settling of the town petitioned:

...that the name of the place may be Suffield, it being the southernmost town that either at present is, or like to be in that Countrey, and neere adjoining to the south border of our Patent in those parts. [sic]

The petition was granted by the Massachusetts Bay court on June 8, 1674. Suffield was incorporated as a town in March 1682.

Also, on early 17th and 18th century maps, Suffield was alternatively spelled as Suthfield.

Suffield and the surrounding area were part of the Equivalent Lands compromise with Massachusetts in 1715–1716.

Suffield's native and adopted sons include The Rev. Ebenezer Gay, a renowned Congregational minister; U.S. Postmaster General Gideon Granger; real estate speculator Oliver Phelps, once the largest landowner in America; composer Timothy Swan; architect Henry A. Sykes; sculptor Olin Levi Warner; Seth Pease, surveyor of the Western Reserve lands in Ohio, most of which were controlled by Suffield financiers and speculators; and Thaddeus Leavitt, inventor of an early cotton gin, merchant and patentee of the Western Reserve lands. Thanks to the town's early prominence and wealth, it boasts an astonishing collection of early New England architecture. The Kent family, for whom the town's library is named, originated in Gloucester, Massachusetts, and boasted relations to many prominent early New England families, including the Dwight family of Northampton, Massachusetts, the Hooker family of Hartford, the Dudleys of Guilford, Connecticut, and the Leavitts of Suffield. Descendants of Robert Olds, who arrived from Sherborne, Dorset, in 1667, include automotive pioneer Ransom Eli Olds, Copperhead Ohio politician Edson Baldwin Olds, his great-grandson USAAF General Robert Olds, and his son, iconic USAF fighter pilot Robin Olds.

Slavery was common throughout the Connecticut River Valley during the 18th century, and the 1774 Census for the Colony of Connecticut listed 37 slaves in Suffield. Throughout the Connecticut Valley, wealthy merchants, tavern owners and town ministers owned slaves. When Major John Pynchon originally purchased from the Pequonnocks and Agawam tribes a six-mile tract of land, which he called Stoney Brooke Plantation, he first ordered the construction of a sawmill, and used two of his slaves, Harry and Roco, for the construction. Suffield's third minister, Reverend Ebenezer Devotion, became minister in 1710, and "sixteen years later the town voted to give him £20 to purchase a slave. Reverend Ebenezer Gay, Devotion's successor, owned six slaves throughout his long term, 1742–1796. Reverend Ebenezer Gay Jr. manumitted his family's three remaining slaves in 1812. They were Titus, Ginny and Dinah. "Princess," a slave belonging to early Suffield settler, Lieut. Joshua Leavitt, died November 5, 1732. Some of Leavitt's descendants became ardent abolitionists, including Joshua Leavitt and his cousin Roger Hooker Leavitt, who operated an Underground Railroad station in Charlemont, Massachusetts.

One of the earliest graduates of the Yale Medical School was one of Suffield's earliest physicians. Dr. Asaph Leavitt Bissell, born in 1791 at Hanover, New Hampshire, to parents originally from Suffield, attended Dartmouth College, and later graduated in the second class of the Yale Medical School. Bissell moved to Suffield, where he rode horseback to make house calls on his patients. Bissell's saddlebags are today in the collection of the Yale Medical School's Historical Society.

== Geography ==
According to the United States Census Bureau, the town has a total area of 42.9 square miles (111.2 km^{2}), of which 42.3 square miles (109.5 km^{2}) is land and 0.69 square miles (1.8 km^{2}), or 1.58%, is water. The town center (Suffield Depot CDP) has a total area of 2.0 square miles (5.1 km^{2}), all of it land.

Suffield is on the west bank of the Connecticut River, 8 miles (13 km) south of the river's largest city, Springfield, Massachusetts, and 16 miles (26 km) north of Connecticut's capital, Hartford. Two bridges span the river to the town of Enfield: the Amtrak/Springfield Terminal Railroad Bridge and the Enfield–Suffield Veterans Bridge.

The Metacomet Ridge, a mountainous trap rock ridgeline that stretches from Long Island Sound to nearly the Vermont border, runs through the center of Suffield from south to north as West Suffield Mountain. The 51-mile (82 km) Metacomet Trail traverses the ridge.

== Demographics ==
Historical population
Census	Pop.	Note	%±
1850	2,962		—
1860	3,260		10.1%
1870	3,277		0.5%
1880	3,225		−1.6%
1890	3,169		−1.7%
1900	3,521		11.1%
1910	3,841		9.1%
1920	4,070		6.0%
1930	4,346		6.8%
1940	4,475		3.0%
1950	4,895		9.4%
1960	6,779		38.5%
1970	8,634		27.4%
1980	9,294		7.6%
1990	11,427		23.0%
2000	13,552		18.6%
2010	15,735		16.1%
2020	15,752		0.1%
U.S. Decennial Census

As of the census of 2000, there were 13,552 people, 4,660 households, and 3,350 families residing in the town. The population density was 321.0 inhabitants per square mile (123.9/km^{2}). There were 4,853 housing units at an average density of 115.0 per square mile (44.4/km^{2}). The racial makeup of the town was 88.67% White, 6.95% African American, 0.24% Native American, 0.94% Asian, 0.04% Pacific Islander, 2.03% from other races, and 1.13% from two or more races. Hispanic or Latino of any race were 4.25% of the population.

There were 4,660 households, out of which 32.8% had children under the age of 18 living with them, 62.2% were married couples living together, 6.9% had a female householder with no husband present, and 28.1% were non-families. Of all households, 23.3% were made up of individuals, and 11.6% had someone living alone who was 65 years of age or older. The average household size was 2.55 and the average family size was 3.04.

In the town, the population was spread out, with 22.1% under the age of 18, 8.0% from 18 to 24, 31.7% from 25 to 44, 24.1% from 45 to 64, and 14.1% who were 65 years of age or older. The median age was 39 years. For every 100 females, there were 116.9 males. For every 100 females age 18 and over, there were 121.1 males.

The median income for a household in the town was $66,698, and the median income for a family was $79,189. Males had a median income of $52,096 versus $35,188 for females. The per capita income for the town was $28,171. About 1.8% of families and 3.6% of the population were below the poverty line, including 2.5% of those under age 18 and 6.2% of those age 65 or over.

== Arts and culture ==
=== Historic homes and sites ===
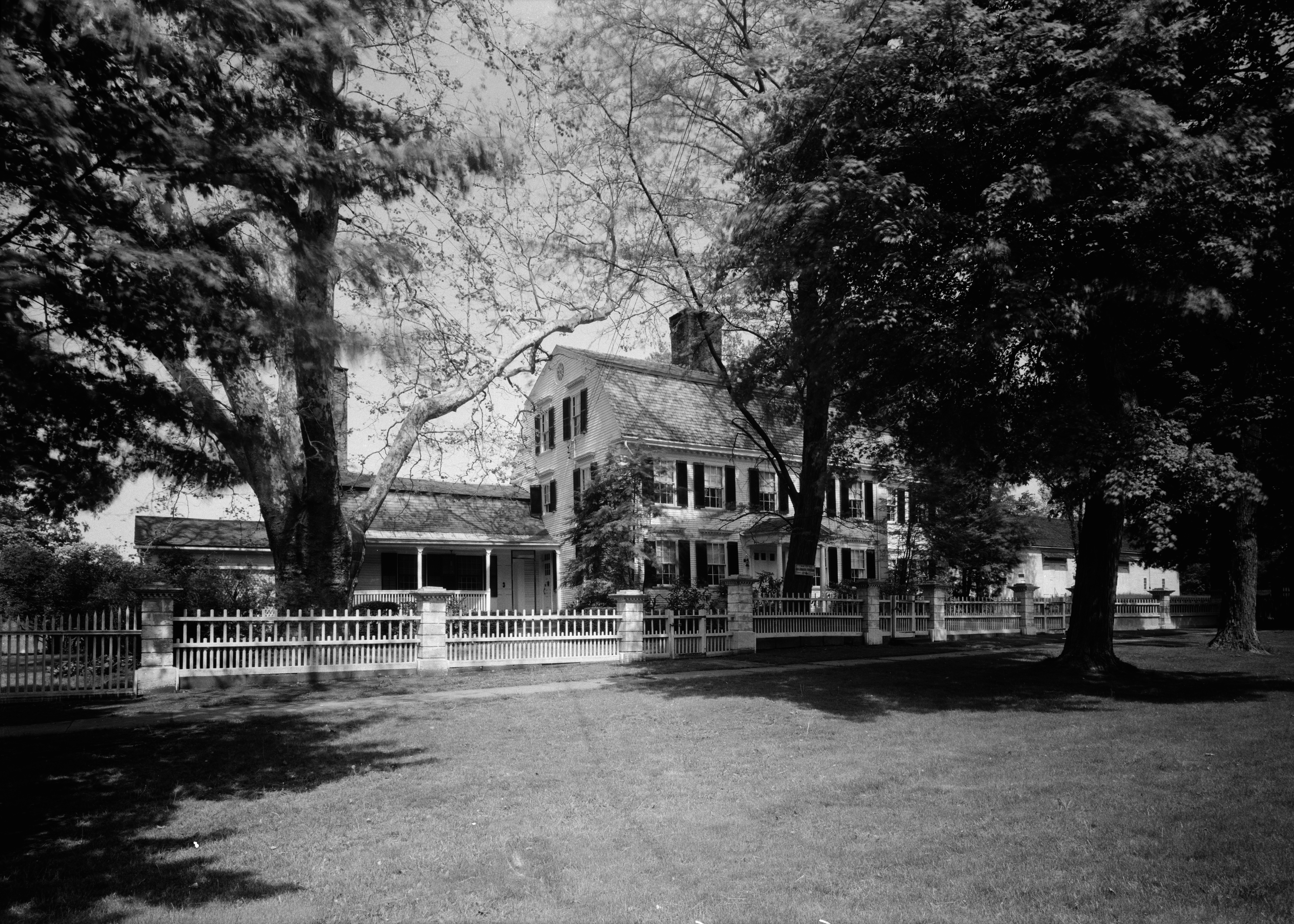
Burbank-Hatheway House, built c. 1735

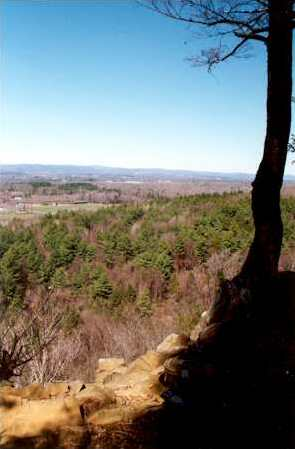
West Suffield Mountain

Main Street, a designated historic district with the Green, three churches, Suffield Academy and vintage colonial and Victorian homes, typifies a New England town. Named for the Kent family of Suffield, the Kent Memorial Library is an important research center for source materials, records, and documents from north-central Connecticut. A walk along Main Street reveals many examples of 18th and 19th century architecture. The Dr. Alexander King House, on the corner of Kent Avenue, and the Phelps-Hatheway House, a little farther north on Main Street, are museums open to the public from May to October.

=== Historic sites ===
Sites listed on the National Register of Historic Places include:

- Alexander King House
- Babb's Beach
- Farmington Canal-New Haven and Northampton Canal – roughly from Suffield to New Haven
- Gothic Cottage
- Hastings Hill Historic District
- Hatheway House (also known as "Phelps-Hatheway House and Garden") – reflects two architectural styles: the original 1761 building is a typical colonial house, the 1794 north wing is one of the first examples of the Neoclassical style in the Connecticut River Valley
- Hilltop Farm
- John Fuller House
- King's Field House
- Lewis-Zukowski House
- Suffield Historic District

== Government ==
=== Voter registration ===
Voter Registration and Party Enrollment as of November 1, 2022
Party	Active Voters	Inactive Voters	Total Voters	Percentage
Democratic	2,566	205	2,771	25.86%
Republican	2,763	215	2,978	27.80%
Unaffiliated	4,197	447	4,644	43.35%
Minor parties	294	27	321	2.99%
Total	9,820	894	10,714	100%

=== List of First Selectmen ===
Representative	Party	Years	Note
Roland Dowd	Suffield Community Party	1995–1997	Defeated for reelection
Robert Skinner	Republican	1997–2001	Did not seek reelection
Elaine Sarsynski	Republican	2001–2005	Did not seek reelection
Scott Lingenfelter	Republican	2005–2009	Defeated for reelection
Tom Frenaye	Democratic	2009–2011	Defeated for reelection
Edward McAnaney	Republican	2011–2015	Defeated for reelection
Melissa Mack	Democratic	2015–2021	Defeated incumbent by a 637-vote margin, ran unopposed in two subsequent elections, defeated for reelection after third term
Colin Moll	Republican	2021–present	

== Education ==
The town's public school system, Suffield Public Schools, includes Spaulding Elementary School, McAlister Intermediate School, Suffield Middle School, and Suffield High School.

Suffield is also the home of Suffield Academy, a private coeducational preparatory school.

== Notable people ==
- Willis Seaver Adams (1842–1921), landscape painter and part of the Tonalism movement which took place in the late 19th century; born in Suffield
- Ran Blake, pianist
- Selden M. Bronson, former Wisconsin State Assemblyman
- Sylvester Graham (1794–1851), American dietary reformer; born in Suffield
- Amos P. Granger, former US Congressman
- Francis Granger, former US Congressman and Postmaster General
- Gideon Granger, former US Postmaster General
- Judson Worthington Hastings (1853–1923), physician and public official
- George M. Hendee. Founder of Indian Motorcycle; moved to Suffield after retiring
- Chris Kellogg, current morning host of The Kellogg Krew morning show on WMAS-FM
- Titus Kent (fl. 1775–1783), an enslaved man who enlisted as a Connecticut militiaman for eight years in the American Revolutionary War.
- W. Bruce Lincoln, scholar of Russian history
- Thaddeus J. Martin. Major General in the United States Air Force and Connecticut Adjutant General
- Eliphalet Remington, Engineer and founder of Remington Arms, born in Suffield
- David Newton Sheldon, 5th President of Colby College
- Israel Smith (1759–1810), served as a member of the United States House of Representatives, a member of the United States Senate and Governor of Vermont; born in Suffield
- Noah Smith (1756–1812), brother of Israel Smith, Justice of the Vermont Supreme Court
- Timothy Swan (1758–1842), composer and hatmaker; resident of Suffield
- Emily Sweeney, member of 2018 US Olympic luge team
- John Tod (1779–1830), United States Congressman for Pennsylvania
- Hugh M. Alcorn (1872–1955), politician and lawyer
- Greg Butler, visual effects supervisor
