= Babb's Beach =

- U.S. National Register of Historic Places
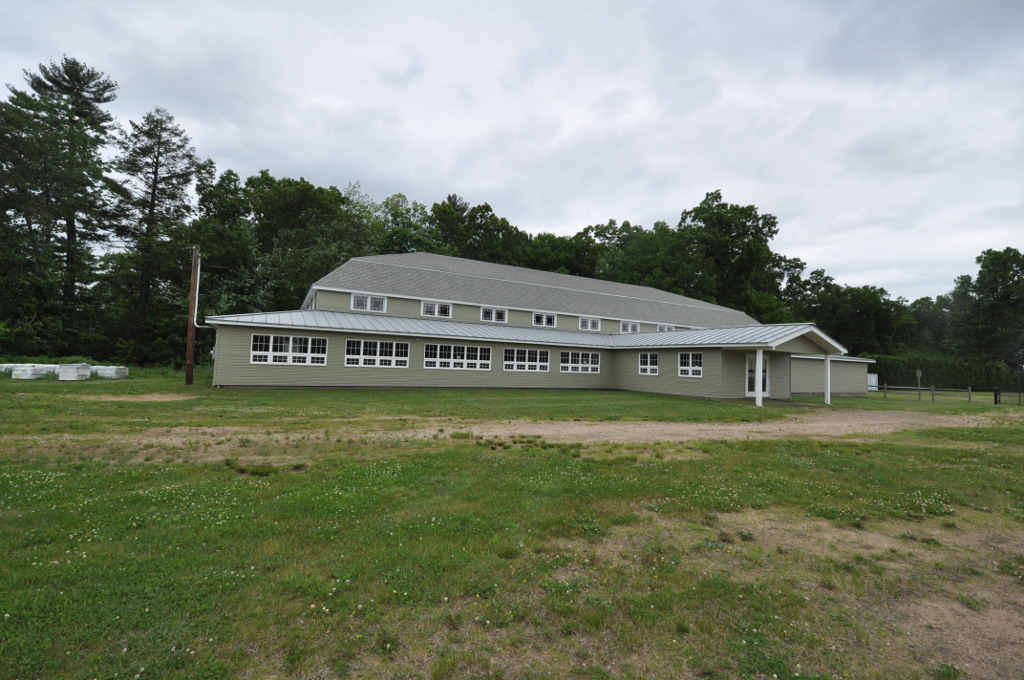
- The dance hall

- Location within Connecticut Location within the United States
- Location: 435 Babbs Road, Suffield, Connecticut
- Coordinates: 42°1′48″N 72°45′4″W
- Area: 7 acres (2.8 ha)
- Built: 1898
- Architect: Babb, Nelson Sr.
- NRHP reference No.: 06000591
- Added to NRHP: July 12, 2006

Babb's Beach is a municipal public recreation area located at 435 Babbs Road in Suffield, Connecticut. It is the former site of what was known as Babb's Beach Amusement Park, a small amusement park that was active in the first half of the 20th century. At its height in the 1930s, the surviving dance hall hosted dances for up to 3,000 weekend patrons. The property, owned by the town since 1977, was listed on the National Register of Historic Places in 2006.

== Description and history ==
Babb's Beach is located in northwestern Suffield, on the eastern shore of the Middle Pond of the Congamond Lakes, which separate Suffield from Southwick, Massachusetts. The property is about 7 acres (2.8 ha) in size, and has 375 feet (114 m) of shoreline that is mostly beaches. The beach is separated from the balance of the property by a low bluff. The remainder of the property is an open grassy area, with the surviving buildings of the amusement park era on the northern edge. A split-rail fence separates the property from the road, with an opening and a short gravel drive leading to an informal parking area.

The most significant building is a large dance hall; other surviving buildings are an arcade, a shooting gallery, and a small generator shed. The dance hall is a single-story wood frame structure, with a central hip-roofed element ringed on three sides by extensions for services, and with a smaller projection on the north side for the stage area.

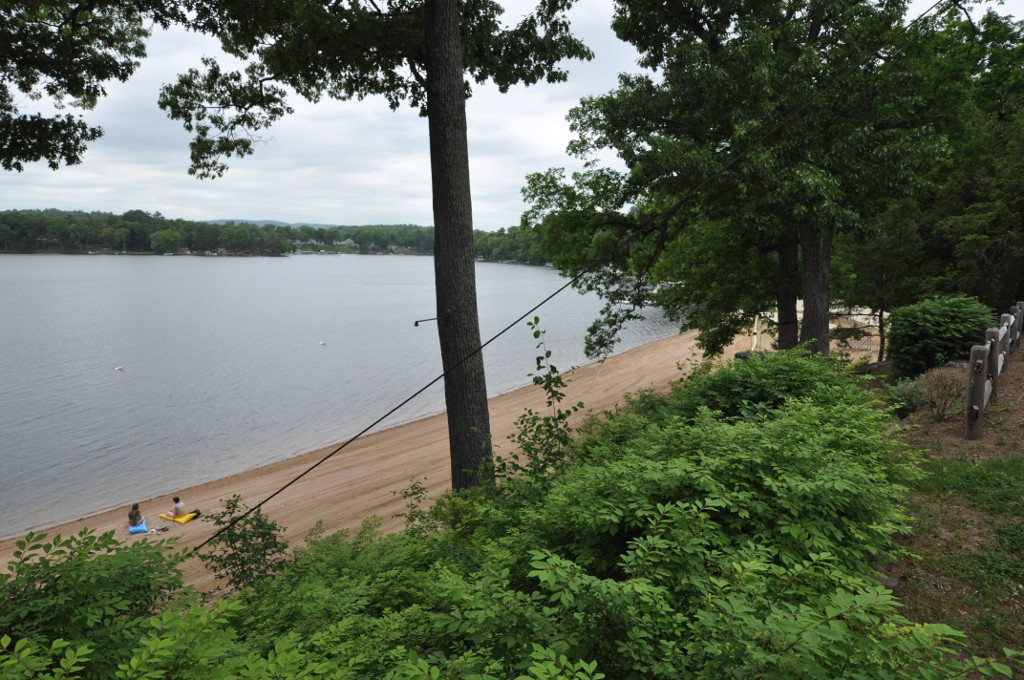
View from the bluff down to the beach and lake

The Congamond Lakes began to develop as a leisure and recreational destination beginning in the 1850s, following the construction of the New Haven and Northampton Railroad along the former route of the Farmington Canal, which had used the lakes as part of its route. Curtis Babb capitalized on the increasing popularity of the lakes as a destination by building a series of small cabins on the lakefront, and offering steamship service to the train on the far shore. Babb's son Nelson took over the property in the 1910s, and expanded its facilities. He converted a horse barn into a dance hall, and also built a bathhouse and boathouse on the waterfront. Facing competition from other lakefront amusement operators, he also offered a variety of rides, including a merry-go-round that was built on a platform in the lake. The dance hall proved a major draw, and was eventually replaced by a larger structure. Performers at the venue included Tommy Dorsey, Harry James, and Kay Kaiser.

Business declined during the Great Depression, which Nelson Babb sought to counter by offering more amusements. He built an arcade, and adapted the dance hall to permit roller skating. The hall became known as one of the region's finest for that activity. Business declined after World War II, and was dealt a significant blow by Hurricane Diane, which destroyed the park's waterfront facilities in 1955. Babb turned the property over to the town in 1977, but continued to operate the dance hall as a roller skating facility until 1997.

== See also ==
- National Register of Historic Places listings in Hartford County, Connecticut
