= Alexander King House =

Historic house in Connecticut, United States

- U.S. National Register of Historic Places
- U.S. Historic district – Contributing property
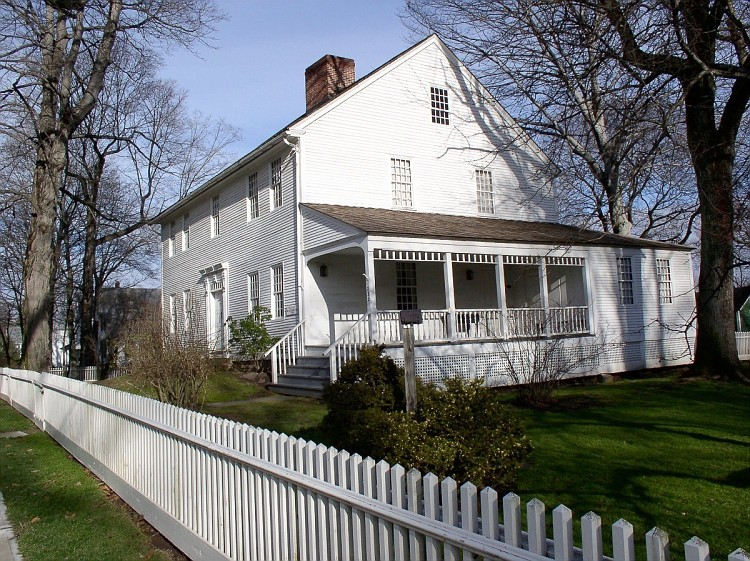

- Location within Connecticut Location within the United States
- Location: 232 South Main Street, Suffield, Connecticut
- Coordinates: 41°58′31″N 72°39′12″W
- Area: 2 acres (0.81 ha)
- Built: 1764
- Part of: Suffield Historic District (ID79003750)
- NRHP reference No.: 76001993

Significant dates
- Added to NRHP: April 26, 1976
- Designated CP: September 25, 1979

The Alexander King House is a historic house at 232 South Main Street in Suffield, Connecticut. Built in 1764, the house interior contains one of the state's finest collections of 18th-century Georgian woodwork. It was listed on the National Register of Historic Places in 1976. It is now a historic house museum operated by the Suffield Historical Society.

== Description and history ==
The Alexander King House stands near the southern edge of Suffield's village center, on the east side of South Main Street opposite Willow Creek Avenue. It is a 2 1/2-story wood-frame structure, with a gabled roof, central chimney, and clapboarded exterior. A single-story gabled ell extends to the rear, and a shed-roof porch is attached to the right side. The main facade is five bays wide, with a center entrance framed by pilasters, a multilight transom window, and a corniced entablature. The interior follows a typical center-chimney plan, with an entrance vestibule with winding stair in front, parlors on either side of the chimney, and a kitchen with small corner rooms in the rear. The left parlor is the finest room in the house, with a fully paneled fireplace wall, and a corner cabinet framed by pilasters rising to an arch. The right parlor also retains original paneling and cabinetry. The stair in the vestibule features delicately carved balusters. The kitchen walls are also mostly paneled, although with simpler styling.

The house was built in 1764 by Alexander King, one of Suffield's leading citizens of the time. King had graduated from Yale College, and practiced medicine in the town. He was politically active, serving as a town selectman for many years and in the state legislature. He supported the American Revolution, and was a delegate to the state convention which ratified the United States Constitution in 1788.

== See also ==
- National Register of Historic Places listings in Hartford County, Connecticut
