= Lewis-Zukowski House =

Historic house in Connecticut, United States

- U.S. National Register of Historic Places
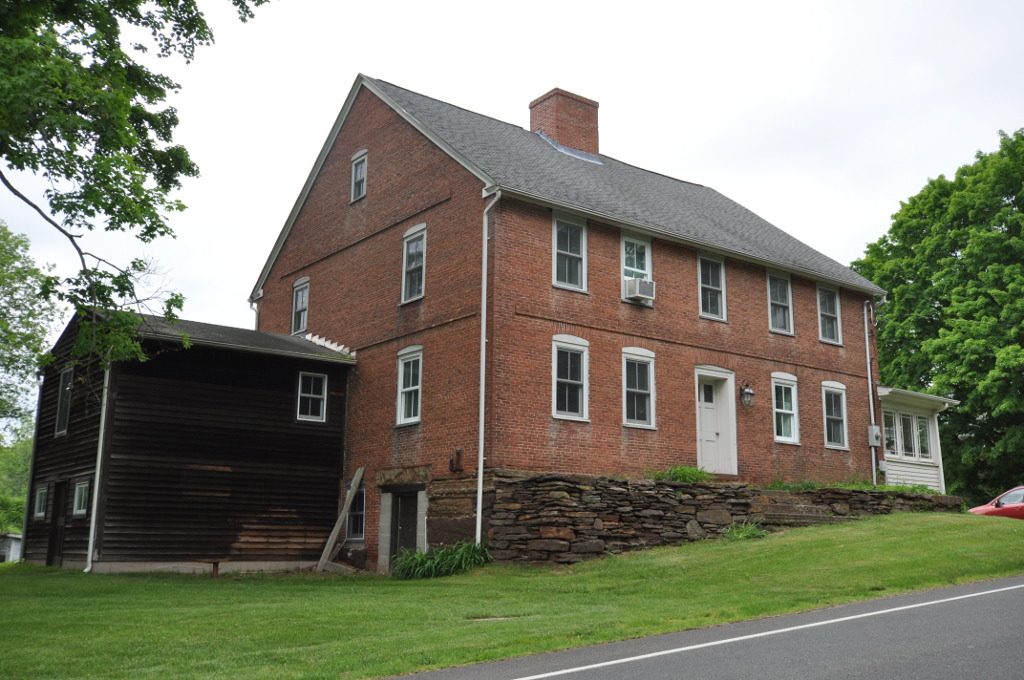

- Location within Connecticut Location within the United States
- Location: 1095 South Grand Street, Suffield, Connecticut
- Coordinates: 41°57′41″N 72°42′41″W
- Area: 3.3 acres (1.3 ha)
- Built: 1781
- Architectural style: Colonial, Italianate, Vernacular Colonial
- NRHP reference No.: 90000147
- Added to NRHP: February 21, 1990

The Lewis-Zukowski House is a historic house at 1095 South Grand Street in Suffield, Connecticut. Built in 1781, it is rare in the town as an 18th-century residence built out of brick, accompanied by a mid-19th century barn. It was listed on the National Register of Historic Places in 1990.

== Description and history ==
The Lewis-Zukowski House stands in a rural setting of southwestern Suffield, on the west side of South Grand Street, just north of its crossing of Stony Brook and just east of the town line with East Granby. It is a 2 1/2-story brick building, with a gabled roof and stone foundation. A wood-frame enclosed shed-roof porch extends across its right side, and a modern wood-frame ell extends to the rear. The main facade is five bays wide, with a center entrance recessed in a rectangular opening, topped by a transom window. North of the house stands a timber-frame barn, sheathed in vertical board siding and covered by a gable roof. Its square cupola and round-arch window in the gable end give it a vague sense of Italianate style, suggesting a construction date in the 1860s. Further back on the property is an early 20th-century tobacco barn, and there are also an early 20th century garage, milk shed, and silo on the property.

The house was built in 1781 by Hezekiah Lewis, a local farmer. The use of brick as a domestic building material was at the time relatively uncommon in Connecticut, making this one of the older of such houses in the state. Lewis was not at the time particularly wealthy, but by his death in 1805 owned a fulling mill. The property is also historically significant for its purchase in 1905 by Michael Zukowski, an immigrant from eastern Europe who was part of a wave of immigration that revitalized the community's agriculture.

== See also ==
- National Register of Historic Places listings in Hartford County, Connecticut
