= Suffield Historic District =

Historic district in Connecticut, United States

- U.S. National Register of Historic Places
- U.S. Historic district
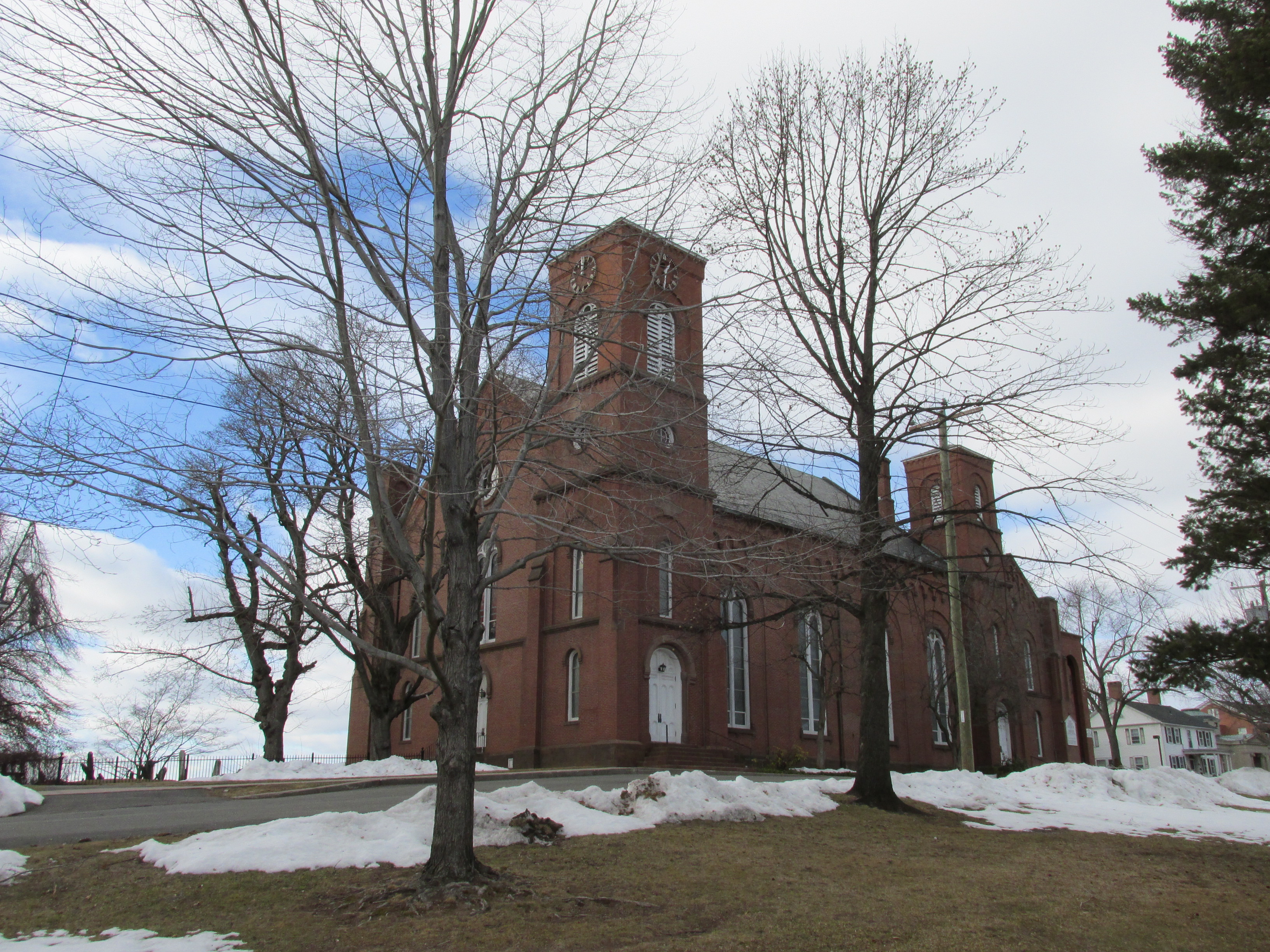

- Location within Connecticut Location within the United States
- Location: Runs along North and South Main Street, Suffield, Connecticut
- Coordinates: 41°58′51″N 72°39′6″W
- Area: 235 acres (95 ha)
- Architectural style: Colonial, Greek Revival, Late Victorian
- NRHP reference No.: 79003750
- Added to NRHP: September 25, 1979

The Suffield Historic District is a historic district encompassing the Main Street area of the town center of Suffield, Connecticut, USA. It was listed on the National Register of Historic Places in 1979 and is part of a larger local historic district. It runs along North and South Main Street from Muddy Brook to north of Mapleton Avenue, and includes a diversity of 18th through early 20th-century architecture.

== Description and history ==
The northern Connecticut town of Suffield was settled in 1670 and incorporated in 1684, and has been a basically agricultural community well into the 20th century. Main Street lots were laid out with comparatively narrow frontage, on which taxation was based, but the lots were generally wide enough to accommodate construction of several homes. In the early 19th century, tobacco was introduced, and the town's fortunes grew with that lucrative crop. A private boarding school, now called Suffield Academy, was established just north of the town center in 1833, contributing to the center's architectural heritage and economic vibrancy. The town's north-south Main Street is architecturally reflective of this pattern of development, generally lacking in large commercial or industrial development and thus retaining the character of a typical New England village center.

The historic district extends for 2.5 miles (4.0 km) of Main Street, with rough boundaries to the east and west of 400 feet (120 m), adjusted in some places for property lines. The architecture outside the central junction is generally residential and of high quality, although architect-designed buildings are relatively uncommon. Institutional buildings near the town center include the Greek Revival Baptist church, the Romanesque Revival Congregational church and the former Kent Memorial Library building, designed by Daniel Burnham and now owned by Suffield Academy. The library is now in one of the district's few Modern buildings, built in 1972 to a design by Hartford architect Warren Platner.

Buildings separately listed on the National Register that are located within the district include the 1762 Hatheway House and the 1764 Alexander King House, both of which are historic house museums.

== See also ==
- National Register of Historic Places listings in Hartford County, Connecticut
