= King's Field House =

Historic house in Connecticut, United States

- U.S. National Register of Historic Places
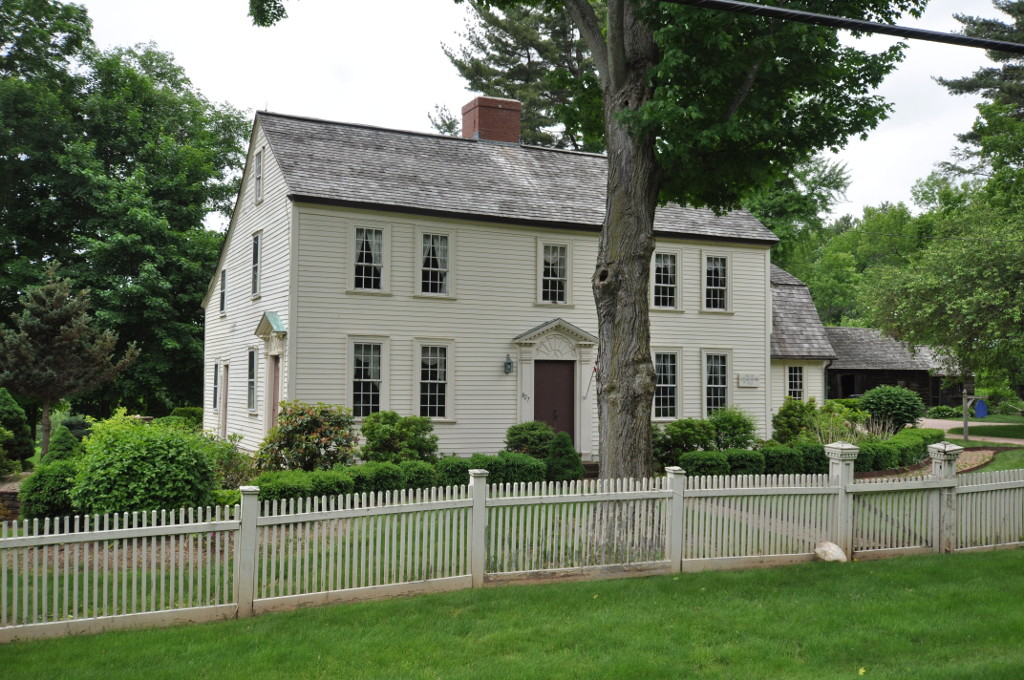

- Location within Connecticut Location within the United States
- Location: 827 North Street, Suffield, Connecticut
- Coordinates: 42°0′11″N 72°38′44″W
- Area: 9.7 acres (3.9 ha)
- Built: 1723
- Built by: King, Lt. William
- NRHP reference No.: 82004440
- Added to NRHP: March 11, 1982

The King's Field House is a historic house at 827 North Street in Suffield, Connecticut. Built about 1723 by the son of an early settler, it is a well-preserved example of 18th-century residential architecture. It was listed on the National Register of Historic Places in 1982.

== Description and history ==
The King's Field House stands in a rural suburban area north of the village center of Suffield, on the west side of North Street. It is a 2 1/2-story wood-frame structure, with a gabled roof, central chimney, and clapboarded exterior. The rear roof line of the main block descends to the first floor, giving the house a classic saltbox profile. A modern gable-roofed addition projects to the rear (north) of the main block. The interior exhibits evidence of three periods of development, all in the 18th century: the timber framing is stylisting from the late First Period (1720s), parlor spaces have been decorated with later Georgian wood paneling, and the main entrance surround, a late 18th-century proto-Federalist surround with a false fanlight.

The house was built about 1723 by Lieutenant William King. King was the son of James King, one of Suffield's early colonial settlers, and was given the surrounding acreage in 1722. King was a major local landowner who was active in civic affairs, serving as a town selectman for many years. Later generations of Kings also lived here, operating diverse businesses including a blacksmith shop and a cooperage. The house underwent restoration in the 1930s by Delphina Clark, the first woman admitted to the Yale School of Architecture and a one-time resident of the house. The house was restored in the 1930s by Delphina Hammer Clark, author of Pictures of Suffield Houses (1940) and Notebooks on Houses in Suffield (1960). The house is now a Bed & Breakfast called Kingsfield.

== See also ==
- National Register of Historic Places listings in Hartford County, Connecticut
