= WFMS =

Country music radio station in Fishers–Indianapolis, Indiana

Fishers, Indiana; United States
- Broadcast area: Indianapolis metropolitan area
- Frequency: 95.5 MHz
- Branding: 95.5 WFMS

Programming
- Format: Country music
- Affiliations: Westwood One

Ownership
- Owner: Cumulus Media, Inc.; (Radio License Holding SRC LLC)
- Sister stations: WJJK, WNTR, WXNT, WNDX, WZPL

History
- First air date: March 15, 1957; 68 years ago

Technical information
- Licensing authority: FCC
- Facility ID: 54622
- Class: B
- ERP: 13,000 watts
- HAAT: 302 meters (991 ft)
- Transmitter coordinates: 39°46′3.00″N 86°0′12.00″W

Links
- Public license information: Public file; LMS
- Webcast: Listen live; Listen Live via iHeart
- Website: wfms.com

WFMS (95.5 FM) is a commercial country music radio station. It is owned by Cumulus Media and is licensed to Fishers, Indiana, while serving the Indianapolis metropolitan area. Its studios and offices are located on North Shadeland Avenue in Indianapolis, and its transmitter is off Burk Road. The station has won several awards from the Country Music Association as large market station of the year.

WFMS is licensed to broadcast in the hybrid HD Radio format.

== History ==
WFMS first signed on the air on March 15, 1957, and originally it was licensed to Indianapolis. It became a country music station in October 1976, and has stayed in the same format since then.

Previous logo
