= Selden M. Bronson =

American politician

Selden M. Bronson (September 20, 1819 – August 5, 1896) was an American politician. Born in Suffield, Connecticut, he moved to Menasha, Wisconsin in 1857. He served as county treasurer and postmaster, and was a member of the Wisconsin State Assembly in 1881 as a Republican. Bronson was a bookkeeper by trade. He died in Menasha of a heart condition.
