= Hastings Hill Historic District =

Historic district in Connecticut, United States

- U.S. National Register of Historic Places
- U.S. Historic district
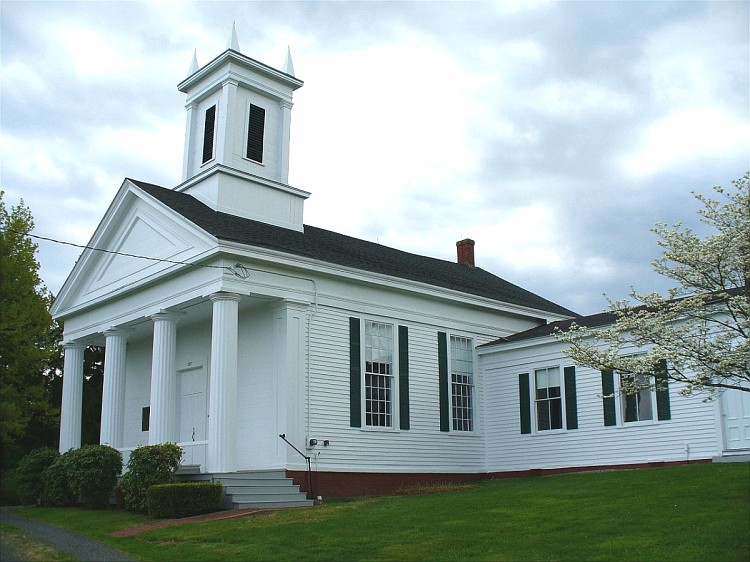
- First Baptist Church

- Location within Connecticut Location within the United States
- Location: 987-1308 Hill Street, 1242 Spruce Street, and 1085-1162 Russell Avenue, Suffield, Connecticut
- Coordinates: 42°0′35″N 72°40′38″W
- Area: 72 acres (29 ha)
- Built: 1769
- Architectural style: Greek Revival
- NRHP reference No.: 79002669
- Added to NRHP: September 14, 1979

The Hastings Hill Historic District encompasses a rural crossroads settlement of the early 19th century at the junction of Spruce Street, Hill Street, and Russell Avenue in Suffield, Connecticut. The area includes well-preserved examples of 18th and 18th-century domestic architecture, as well as the 1842 First Baptist Church and a district schoolhouse. It was listed on the National Register of Historic Places in 1979.

== Description and history ==
What is now Hill Street in rural central northern Suffield was laid out in 1726 along a north–south ridge, and was historically part of one of the main routes between Windsor, Connecticut and Springfield, Massachusetts. The area developed in part over religious differences: Joseph Hastings began opposing Congregationalist teachings and practices as early as 1740, and was ordained a Baptist minister. Their church, built at Hill and Russell where the present 1842 Greek Revival church now stands, was one of the first Baptist congregations to be established in Connecticut. This became the nexus for a small village, in which the Hastings house (still standing next to the church) served as a tavern for travelers, and a blacksmith and shop were located across the triangular green at the street corner. In the early 20th century a local barn was adapted for use as a summer theater venue, lasting until World War II.

The historic district is centered at the junction of Hill Street and Russell Avenue, and extends north and south along Hill Street. The oldest house in the district, 1061 Hill Street, is estimated to date to 1740, and was an early conservation project of Delphina Clark, the first woman admitted to the Yale School of Architecture. That property also includes the tobacco barn that housed the theater, retaining the stage and proscenium arch in its interior. The district's dominant feature is the 1842 Baptist Church, a fine example Greek Revival architecture. Adjacent to it is the much-altered house of the Hastingses, believed to have been built in the 18th century either by Rev. Joseph Hastings or his son.

== See also ==
- National Register of Historic Places listings in Hartford County, Connecticut
