= WJJK =

Radio station in Noblesville–Indianapolis, Indiana

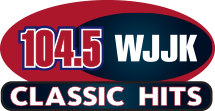

Noblesville, Indiana; United States
- Broadcast area: Indianapolis metropolitan area
- Frequency: 104.5 MHz
- Branding: Classic Hits 104.5 WJJK

Programming
- Format: Classic hits

Ownership
- Owner: Cumulus Media Inc.; (Radio License Holding SRC LLC)
- Sister stations: WFMS, WNDX, WNTR, WXNT, WZPL

History
- First air date: September 25, 1950; 75 years ago
- Former call signs: WAJC (1950–1993); WGRL (1993–1997); WGLD (1997–2005)
- Former frequencies: 91.3 MHz (1950–1956)
- Call sign meaning: Jack (former JACK FM branding)

Technical information
- Licensing authority: FCC
- Facility ID: 28609
- Class: B
- ERP: 50,000 watts
- HAAT: 150 meters (490 ft)
- Transmitter coordinates: 39.840°N 86.176°W

Links
- Public license information: Public file; LMS
- Webcast: Listen live
- Website: www.1045wjjk.com

WJJK (104.5 FM) is a commercial radio station licensed to Noblesville, Indiana, and broadcasting to the Indianapolis metropolitan area. It is owned by Cumulus Media and broadcasts a classic hits radio format. Its studios and offices are on North Shadeland Avenue on the east side of Indianapolis.

WJJK has an effective radiated power (ERP) of 50,000 watts, the maximum for most stations in Indiana. Its transmitter is located on Bulldog Road, near the athletic fields for Butler University, which once owned the station. WJJK is licensed to broadcast in the HD Radio (hybrid) format.

== History ==
On September 25, 1950, the station signed on the air as WAJC, with the call letters standing for Arthur Jordan College of Music. It was originally a non-commercial, college radio station at 91.3 MHz. It moved to its current frequency of 104.5 MHz in 1956, as the Butler University radio station. The move came with an increase in power to 8,800 watts, but still just a fraction of its current output.

In 1993, Butler University decided to discontinue its radio station. The 104.5 frequency was sold to the Susquehanna Radio Corporation, which converted it to a commercial radio station. Susquehanna changed the call sign to WGRL and it adopted a country music format.

The call letters were changed to WGLD in 1997 when the station flipped to an oldies format as "Gold 104.5." On March 13, 2005, 6pm local time WGLD became WJJK, dropping oldies and subscribing to the nationally syndicated "JACK FM" adult hits format. The station became known as "104.5 Jack FM."

In 2006, Susquehanna Radio was acquired by current owner Cumulus Media. Also in 2006, in September, WJJK became a classic hits station, while keeping the same call letters, marking a return to a format similar to that of the former Gold 104.5 oldies format. The name "Jack" was dropped in December 2007 and it is now known as "Classic Hits 104.5 WJJK."
