= Titus Kent =

American Slave

Titus Kent (fl. 1775–1783) was an enslaved man in colonial Suffield, Connecticut who enlisted in the Connecticut militia, serving throughout the American Revolutionary War. His slaveholder was Samuel Kent, from Suffield, Connecticut.

== Enslavement ==
Titus Kent was an enslaved servant to Samuel Kent beginning in 1772, by the time of the Revolutionary War, his slaveholder was Elihu Kent Sr. Kent lived in Suffield, Hartford, Connecticut, where he was also enslaved by other people.

== Military service ==
Upon hearing of the Lexington Alarm (April 19, 1775), announcing the outbreak of the American Revolutionary War, Captain Elihu Kent Sr. led 59 men of the local militia to Boston, first stopping at Springfield, Massachusetts. Kent, who enlisted in the militia, served in Elihu's company in the 3rd Connecticut Regiment in the Connecticut Line, commanded by Colonel Samuel Wyllys. Titus served for eight years, most of the time in Long Island, New York.

Suffield volunteers comprised about one-third of the Connecticut militia. Town militia companies contributed to the Connecticut militia regiments. Initially, the Continental Congress discouraged slaves from enlisting in the Continental Army, to appease the slave states. However, the Kingdom of Great Britain offered freedom to slaves who fought on behalf of the British Army, forcing the Continental Congress to relent and offer the same.

== Personal life ==
Kent had a daughter, Hannah Austin. She was from Hartford, Connecticut. She washed laundry to earn the money to raise her four children and care for her disabled husband. Hannah raised money for the local anti-slavery society. (Note: There is also a genealogical note: "Titus (colored) BLW #1665-100, CT Line, a Jonathan Kent heir of Elihu Kent made aff'dt 8 Mar 1830 that Elihu Kent was the owner of Titus Kent a slave, a Hannah Austin made aff'dt in 1830 at Suffield CT & gave the following, towit; that her mother became the wife of Samuel Kent, Esq of Suffield CT & that her step-father Samuel Kent owned a slave named Philip who was exchanged for a slave named Titus & after the suid Samuel Kent died he became the slave of Elihu Kent a son of Samuel Kent.")

After the war, he applied for a pension or bounty-land warrant. On April 15, 1806, the United States Congress passed an act to provide bounty-land warrants to soldiers of the Revolutionary War. In 1830, an heir of Titus, Jonathan K. Kent, received a warrant on his behalf.

== Memorial ==
In recognition of his military service from 1775 to 1783, a Witness Stone Memorial was installed by the Suffield Historical Society and the Sibbil Dwight Kent Chapter of the Daughters of the American Revolution in 2022.

== See also ==
- Titus Gay, who called himself Titus Kent after his father's surname. Titus was an enslaved man until he was freed in 1812. He also lived in Suffield, Connecticut.
