= Robert Everett Pattison =

American clergyman (1800–1874)

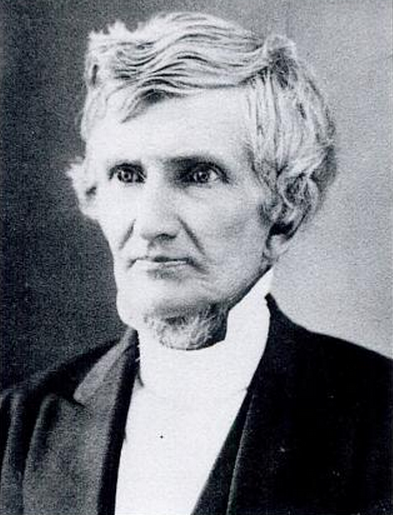

3rd President of Colby College
- In office 1836–1840
- Preceded by: Rufus Babcock
- Succeeded by: Eliphaz Fay

6th President of Colby College
- In office 1853–1857
- Preceded by: David Newton Sheldon
- Succeeded by: James Tift Champlin

Personal details
- Born: August 19, 1800 Benson, VT
- Died: November 21, 1874 (aged 74) St. Louis, MO
- Education: Amherst College

Robert Everett Pattison (August 19, 1800 – November 21, 1874) was an American clergyman, and served as both the third and sixth president of Colby College.

== Life ==
He graduated at Amherst College in 1826, was appointed a tutor in Columbian College, D. C, was ordained in 1829, and in 1830 became pastor of the First Baptist Church in America in Providence, RI. From this post he was called to a professorship in Waterville College (now Colby College in Maine, of which he was president from 1836 to 1840. He then became pastor of the second Baptist church of St. Louis, Mo., and in 1841 returned to his pastoral charge at Providence. In 1843 he was elected one of the corresponding secretaries of the Baptist Board of Foreign Missions. He was president and professor of Christian theology in the western Baptist theological institute, at Covington, Ky., from 1845 to 1848, when he was appointed to a similar professorship in the Newton Theological Seminary, Mass., from which he was again called to the presidency of Waterville college in 1853. In 1858 he resigned and took charge of the Oread Institute, at Worcester, Mass. He was professor of systematic theology in Shurtleff College, Alton, 111., from 1864 to 1870, when he was called to a professorship in the Baptist theological seminary of Chicago, which he resigned on account of ill health in 1874. For one year he was acting president of the old university of Chicago.

== Publications ==
- Commentary, Explanatory, Doctrinal, and Practical, on the Epistle to the Ephesians (Boston, 1859).
