= Gothic Cottage (Suffield, Connecticut) =

Historic house in Connecticut, United States

- U.S. National Register of Historic Places
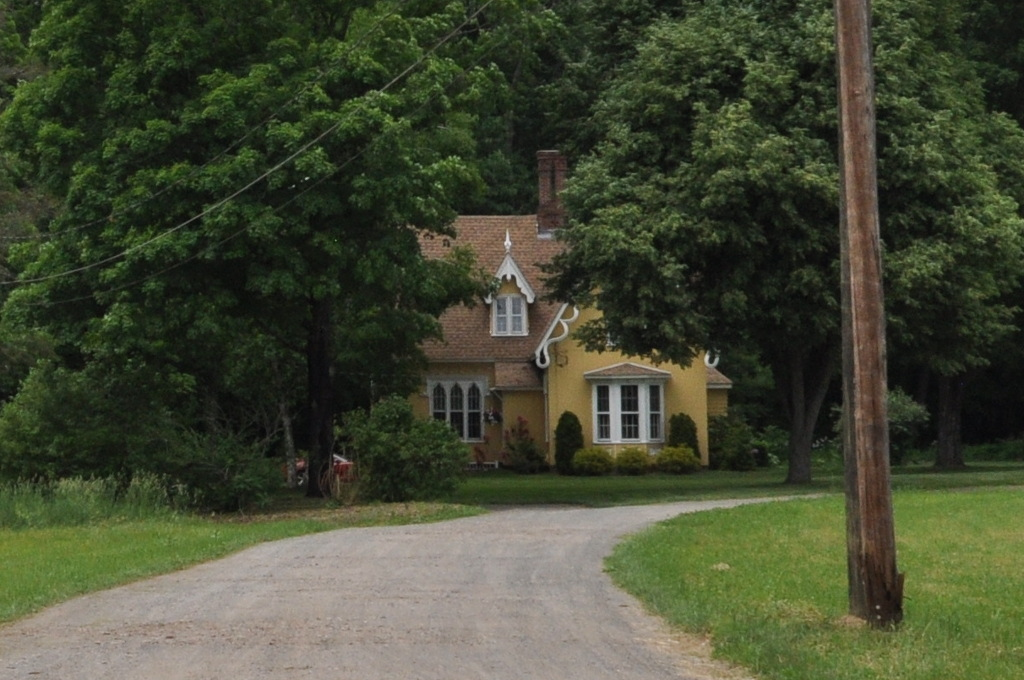

- Location within Connecticut Location within the United States
- Location: 1425 Mapleton Avenue, Suffield, Connecticut
- Area: 7.5 acres (3.0 ha)
- Built: 1846
- Built by: Sikes, David Lyman
- Architectural style: Gothic Revival
- NRHP reference No.: 82004441
- Added to NRHP: February 25, 1982

The Gothic Cottage is a historic house at 1425 Mapleton Avenue in Suffield, Connecticut. Built in 1846, it is a distinctive local example of the Gothic cottage style popularized by Andrew Jackson Downing. It was listed on the National Register of Historic Places in 1982.

== Description and history ==
The Gothic Cottage is in a rural setting of northeastern Suffield, set well back (across a field) on the west side of Mapleton Avenue. It is an L-shaped wood-frame structure, 1 1/2 stories in height, with a steeply pitched gable roof. Its exterior is clad in vertical board siding, and its gables are adorned with carved bargeboard, with finials and pendants at the peaks. Windows are generally long and narrow with lancet-arch tops, set in groups of one, two, or three, with drip-moulding surrounds. The main entrance is in the crook of the L, opening into a shed-roofed vestibule. Gothic details are continued inside the house, where lancet arches are found on the staircase.

The cottage was built in 1846 by David Lyman Sikes, a descendant of one of Suffield's first colonial settlers. It appears to be based on a design published by Andrew Jackson Downing in his 1842 Cottage Residences, a major work promoting domestic Gothic Revival architecture, and is one of the only examples of this style in the town. The house was built on land that had long been in the Sikes family, and was still in the family when the property was listed on the National Register in 1982.

== See also ==
- National Register of Historic Places listings in Hartford County, Connecticut
