= WNDX =

Mainstream rock radio station in Lawrence, Indiana, United States

- Lawrence, Indiana; United States
- Broadcast area: Indianapolis metropolitan area
- Frequency: 93.9 MHz (HD Radio)
- Branding: 93.9X

Programming
- Format: Mainstream rock
- Subchannels: HD2: WXNT simulcast (sports radio)

Ownership
- Owner: Cumulus Media; (Radio License Holding SRC LLC)
- Sister stations: WFMS, WJJK, WNTR, WXNT, WZPL

History
- First air date: February 12, 1993; 33 years ago
- Former call signs: WXTZ (1993–1996); WGLD (1996–1997); WGRL (1997–2004); WISG (2004–2006); WWFT (2006–2008); WRWM (2008–2017); WYRG (2017–2019)
- Call sign meaning: Indy's X

Technical information
- Licensing authority: FCC
- Facility ID: 71438
- Class: B1
- ERP: 8,400 watts
- HAAT: 140 meters (460 ft)
- Transmitter coordinates: 39°49′39″N 85°58′51″W

Links
- Public license information: Public file; LMS
- Webcast: Listen live Listen live (via TuneIn)
- Website: www.939xindy.com

WNDX (93.9 FM) is a commercial radio station, licensed to Lawrence, Indiana, and serving the Indianapolis metropolitan area. It is owned by Cumulus Media and airs a mainstream rock radio format, using the moniker 93-9X. The studios and offices are located on North Shadeland Avenue on the east side of Indianapolis.

WNDX's transmitter is located off 38th Street, also on the east side of Indianapolis. It is licensed by the Federal Communications Commission to broadcast in the HD (hybrid) format.

== History ==
=== Easy listening (1993–1996) ===
The station signed on the air on February 12, 1993, as WXTZ, "Ecstasy 93.9." It was licensed to Fishers, and carried an easy listening format similar to the original WXTZ, which broadcast at 103.3 several years prior.

=== Urban oldies (1996) ===
The easy format lasted until January 15, 1996, when it was dropped in favor of ABC Radio's now-defunct "Solid Gold Soul" satellite format, which played urban oldies, using the moniker "Gold 93.9." The call sign changed to WGLD in February 1996 to reflect this change.

=== Smooth jazz (1996–1997) ===
Solid Gold Soul was short-lived, and on October 10, 1996, WGLD changed to another satellite format, Jones Radio Network's smooth jazz format.

=== Country (1997–2001) ===
The license was sold to Susquehanna Broadcasting in 1997. Management decided that Susquehanna's modern country music "flanker station," WGRL "104.5 The Bear," would be moved to 93.9, while a new format, under 93.9's WGLD calls, would be placed on 104.5. To smooth over the transition, the two stations began simulcasting "The Bear" on May 30, 1997. Once the move was complete on June 10, the WGLD call letters moved to 104.5 and became oldies "Gold 104.5." The frequency switch did not help WGRL's ratings, as it experienced a substantial ratings drop once "The Bear" moved to 93.9. As a result, the station became more music-intensive and several disc jockeys were let go. By 2001, WGRL simulcast WFMS in morning drive time while Donnie Claw, the lone survivor from the 104.5 days, hosted the afternoon drive shift. The end of The Bear came on November 19, 2001, when the format was dropped for Christmas music as "93.9 The Christmas Channel."

=== 80s Hits (2001–2004) ===
On December 25, 2001, 93.9 flipped to an 80s hits format as "Retro 93-9."

=== Contemporary Christian (2004–2006) ===
The format lasted until July 9, 2004, when – following a five-day stunt of TV themes as "TV 93.9" – the station flipped to Contemporary Christian as "93.9 The Song." The call sign was also changed at this time to WISG. "The Song" lasted for a couple of years and saw modest success.

A month after the format change, in August 2004, WISG changed its city of license from Fishers to Lawrence, relocated its transmitter from Noblesville to east Indianapolis, and upgraded its power from 2,950 watts to 6,900 watts to provide better coverage of the Indianapolis radio market (it later upgraded to 8,400 watts in 2011).

=== Talk (2006–2008) ===
On December 26, 2006, "The Song" was moved to 93.9's HD2 channel while a new talk format, known as "FM Talk 93.9," moved to the main channel. The station's call letters were changed to WWFT.

WWFT aired mostly nationally syndicated programming, featuring Mancow, Sean Hannity, Dave Ramsey, and others until November 16, 2007, when programming was replaced with the return of "93.9 The Christmas Channel." At Noon on Christmas Day, WWFT dropped Christmas music and stunted again, repeating the tracks "Lonesome Road" by Dean Elliot & His Big Band and "Swans Splashdown" by Jean-Jacques Perrey.

=== Soft adult contemporary (2008–2009) ===
Logo as "Warm 93.9" (2008–2009)

A new format, soft adult contemporary "Warm 93-9," debuted at 9:39 a.m. on January 2, 2008, with a commitment to play 93 hours of commercial-free music during its first week. The first song played on "Warm 93-9" was The Police's "Every Breath You Take". On March 3, 2008, WWFT changed call letters to WRWM. The program director and morning drive host was Fritz Moser. During the Warm era, "The Song" returned to the main station for six hours on Sunday mornings.

=== Top 40 (2009–2015) ===
At 12:01 a.m. on July 2, 2009, the station dropped the 18-month-old Soft AC format; the station had finished 21st in the most recent Arbitron ratings and never mounted a serious challenge to main rival WYXB. The last song on "Warm" was The Beach Boys' "Kokomo". Afterwards, the station began stunting again, this time with construction sounds. At 9:40 a.m. on July 3, 2009, the station flipped to Top 40/CHR as "Indy's Hit Music Station, i94" and launched with 940 songs commercial-free. The format change marks the frequency's sixth new format since 2001. i94's first song was The Black Eyed Peas' "Boom Boom Pow".

In July 2011, the station adjusted its daytime format to hot adult contemporary, while remaining CHR at night. This did not attract many listeners, with i94 losing the ratings battle against WNOW-FM and WZPL, along with WNTR when that station flipped to Hot AC in May 2013.

=== Classic hip hop (2015–2017) ===
Logo for "93.9 The Beat" (2015–2017)

On December 19, 2014, at 3 p.m., after promoting a "major announcement about i94," WRWM began airing a "Classic Hip-Hop Holiday Weekend", forcing rival WHHH to do the same. Unlike WHHH, however, WRWM announced the following Monday that it would switch to the format full-time, keeping the "i94" name but running jockless. On January 26, 2015, at 9:39 a.m., the station re-branded as "93-9 The Beat", with no change in format.

The flip increased the station's ratings dramatically, going from 15th to first place in the ratings in Indianapolis with a 7.7 share. However, this ratings surge was short-lived, as the station eventually fell back towards a 2.7 share by October 2017. WRWM's initial success served as the basis of Westwood One's "Classic Hip-Hop," a satellite-delivered format that was launched May 22, 2015. Westwood One is co-owned with WRWM.

=== Top 40 (2017–2019) ===
Logo as "Energy", 2017-2019

On November 17, 2017, at 5:30 p.m., after playing "It's So Hard to Say Goodbye" by Boyz II Men, and a 10-minute farewell montage and brief teasers for random new formats, WRWM began stunting with Christmas music again, this time as "93.9 North Pole Radio." The station also began to post teasers on its Facebook page themed around the letter "E", and promoted that "E-Day" would occur at 9:39 a.m. on December 26. At that time, the station changed its call letters to WYRG, and returned to CHR as "Energy 93-9," launching with "...Ready for It?" by Taylor Swift.

=== Mainstream rock (2019–present) ===
The future of Energy came in doubt in February 2019, with Cumulus acquiring then-rival Top 40 (CHR) outlet WZPL as part of a multi-station trade with Entercom, rendering Energy's format as redundant. Those doubts would be verified that May, as the sale closed, and WYRG began running liners advising that Energy would soon be "turned off" and redirecting listeners to WZPL.

On May 24, 2019, at noon, after playing "Bye Bye Bye" by *Nsync, Cumulus flipped WYRG to a mainstream rock format as "93-9X". The station changed its call sign to WNDX on May 28, 2019. The first song on "93-9X" was "Enter Sandman" by Metallica, which began a commercial-free Memorial Day weekend to launch the format.

The station now competes with iHeartMedia's combo of classic rock WFBQ and alternative rock WOLT. Derrek Madden, the program director of co-owned mainstream rock station KXXR Minneapolis, assisted with setting up WNDX with a similar format for the Indianapolis market. The majority of the station's DJs are pre-recorded from other Cumulus stations across the country.
