= George M. Hendee =

American bicycle racer

George Hendee
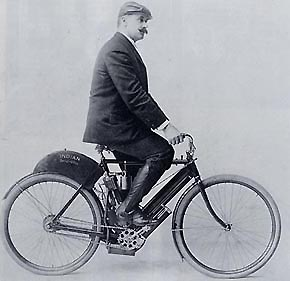
- Hendee in 1904
- Born: George Mallory Hendee; October 2, 1866; Watertown, Massachusetts, U.S.
- Died: June 13, 1943 (aged 76); Suffield, Connecticut, U.S.
- Occupation: Motorcycle manufacturer
- Spouse(s): Edith M. Cordwell (1888–1895); Edith Leona Hale (1915 – until his death)
- Parent(s): William Goodell Hendee; Emma Dwight Upton

George Mallory Hendee (October 2, 1866 – June 13, 1943) was an American bicycle racer and the co-founder of the Indian Motocycle Manufacturing Company. Hendee first became involved with the bicycle industry after his bicycle-racing career. Not only did Hendee build bicycles, but he also sponsored numerous bicycle events and racers. Once he retired from racing and the manufacturing company, Hendee bred cattle and chickens on his farm.

== Bicycle racing ==
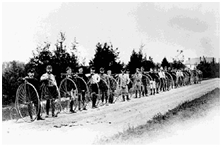
George M. Hendee, furthest to the left

George M. Hendee took up bicycle racing at age 16. He won the United States National Amateur High Wheel Championship in 1886, setting a new world record over a dirt half-mile track of 2 minutes 27.4 seconds, which he held until 1892. Hendee was America's first national cycling champion, winning 302 of the 309 races he entered and dedicating himself to racing and traveling to bicycling events.

== Manufacturing ==
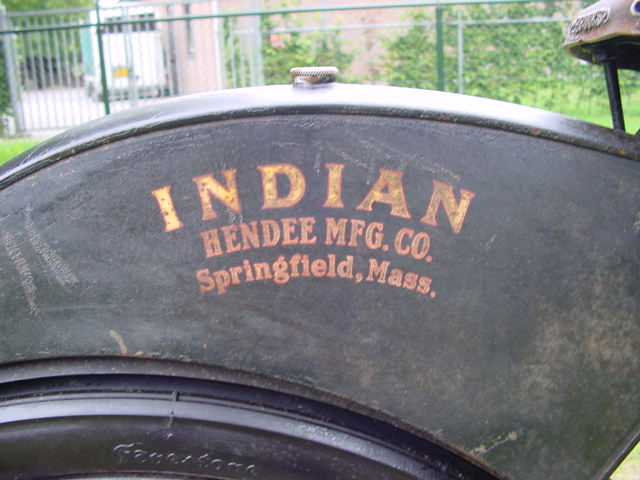

In 1892 Hendee retired from bicycle racing and began making Silver King bicycles at 41-43 Taylor Street in Springfield, Massachusetts in 1895. In 1896, the Hendee & Nelson Manufacturing Company at 478 Main Street in Springfield, Massachusetts was building safety bicycles under the names Silver King for men and Silver Queen for women. The company went bankrupt; and Hendee purchased the entire inventory at auction and set up shop on Worthington Street in 1898, incorporating the Hendee Manufacturing Company with a capital stock of $5,000. The company's new line of bicycles was called Indian.

Hendee sponsored a number of bicycle racers and events throughout New England. It was during an event at Madison Square Garden in New York in January 1900 that Hendee became acquainted with Carl Oscar Hedström and witnessed first-hand the excellent performance of the motorized pacing bicycle built by Hedström.

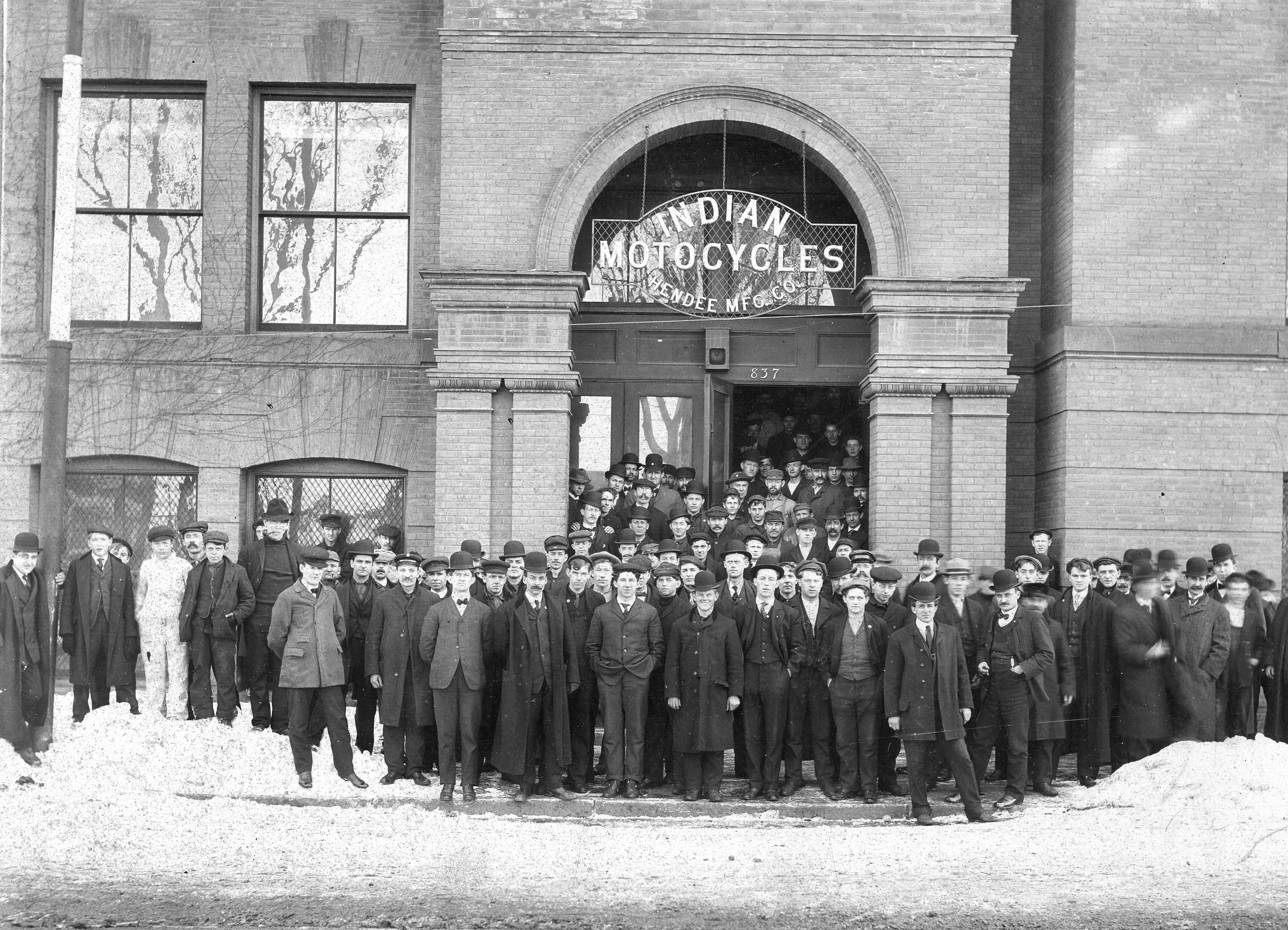
Employees at the Hendee Factory, Springfield, Mass

Hendee and Hedström signed a partnership agreement in January 1901, and Hedström became the chief engineer and designer. The first Indian prototype was built by Hedström at the old Worcester Cycle Manufacturing Company in Middletown, Connecticut, and the first public demonstration was held on Cross Street in Springfield, Massachusetts at 12:00 noon on Saturday June 1, 1901.

Hedström traveled to Aurora, Illinois, to refine his engine design, and Hendee Mfg. Co. contracted and licensed the Aurora Automatic Machine Company to build the engine (the contract was terminated on March 5, 1907). Hedström supervised all aspects of manufacture, including the design of production molds and machines and expansion of both factories (the main factory on State Street and the forging factory "Hendeeville" in East Springfield), while Hendee, as president and general manager, traveled extensively to set up dealerships and arrange financing.

By 1912, Hendee Manufacturing was the world's largest motorcycle manufacturer. In 1913, the company's production peaked at 32,000 units. The company's name was changed to Indian Motocycle in October 1923.

== Retirement ==
In 1915, Hendee resigned as general manager but remained as president. In 1916, at the age of 49, Hendee retired from Hendee Manufacturing after a disagreement with the board of directors over the direction of the organization. In his retirement, he bred Guernsey cattle and White leghorn chickens on his 500-acre (200 ha) Hilltop Farm in Suffield, Connecticut. He sold his estate in 1940 and moved to a smaller home in Suffield where he died in 1943 at the age of 76.
