= WHLL =

Radio station in Springfield, Massachusetts

- Springfield, Massachusetts; United States
- Broadcast area: Greater Springfield
- Frequency: 1450 kHz
- Branding: Nueva 98.1

Programming
- Language: Spanish
- Format: contemporary hit radio; latin pop; reggaeton; tropical music

Ownership
- Owner: Audacy, Inc.; (Audacy License, LLC)
- Sister stations: WMAS-FM; WWEI

History
- First air date: September 1, 1932
- Former call signs: WMAS (1932–2009)
- Call sign meaning: in reference to the station's studios at the Basketball Hall of Fame

Technical information
- Licensing authority: FCC
- Facility ID: 36545
- Class: C
- Power: 1,000 watts (unlimited)
- Transmitter coordinates: 42°6′33.34″N 72°36′38.32″W
- Translator: 98.1 W251CT (Springfield)
- Repeater: 94.7 WMAS-FM HD2 (Enfield, Connecticut)

Links
- Public license information: Public file; LMS
- Webcast: Listen live (via Audacy)
- Website: www.audacy.com/nueva981

WHLL (1450 AM) – branded as Nueva 98.1 – is a commercial radio station broadcasting a Spanish-language Latin pop format licensed to Springfield, Massachusetts. Owned by Audacy, Inc., the station serves the Springfield metropolitan area; and the Pioneer Valley of Western Massachusetts. The WHLL studios are located at the Naismith Memorial Basketball Hall of Fame in Springfield, alongside sister stations WMAS-FM and WWEI, while the station transmitter, shared with WMAS-FM, resides in Springfield's Brightwood neighborhood. In addition to a standard analog transmission, WHLL simulcasts over low-power analog Springfield translator W251CT (98.1 FM) and on the second HD Radio channel of WMAS-FM, and streams online via Audacy.

== History ==
In May 1932, Albert S. Moffatt, a former newsreel photographer, was granted a construction permit by the Federal Radio Commission to begin work on a new radio station, with the sequential call sign WHEU. When the station officially signed on, its call letters were changed to WMAS. The letters stood for Massachusetts, and they also include the owner's initials, although not in the correct order. The station's studios were in the Hotel Stonehaven, and when it signed on for the first time, on September 1, 1932, it broadcast on 1420 kHz with 100 watts.

During the 1940s and 1950s, WMAS was a member of the Yankee Network, a programming service originating in Boston for New England radio stations. WMAS was also a CBS Radio Network affiliate. It carried the CBS line-up of dramas, comedies, news, sports, soap operas, game shows, children's shows and big band broadcasts, during the "Golden Age of Radio".

In 1947, WMAS-FM signed on. At first, both stations mostly simulcast their programming.

When network programming shifted from radio to television, WMAS-AM-FM switched to a full service, middle of the road music format. WMAS 1450 later had a country music format as "The Country Leader". On-air personalities included Dave Thatcher (also the station's news director), Fred Stevens, and Mike Williamson.

WMAS was one of the original "Music Of Your Life" adult standards radio stations, as its previous owner for many years, Bob Lappin (Lappin Communications, Inc.) was friends with the format's originator and syndicator, Al Ham.

In June 2004, WMAS-AM-FM were sold to Citadel Broadcasting for $22 million. Citadel switched AM 1450 to an unsuccessful talk radio format, then tried oldies, playing Scott Shannon's The True Oldies Channel from ABC Radio.

On April 7, 2009, the format was changed to sports radio with programming from ESPN Radio. The call sign was changed to WHLL to represent the word "Hall". The Naismith Memorial Basketball Hall of Fame is located in Springfield and the station's studios were moved to the facility. Citadel merged with Cumulus Media on September 16, 2011. After the merger, WHLL switched networks to CBS Sports Radio, a network that Cumulus Media had a financial interest in.

On December 27, 2018, WHLL changed its format from sports to country, branded as "98.1 Nash Icon", in line with the launch of an FM simulcast of WHLL on translator W251CT, which is licensed to Springfield.

On February 13, 2019, Cumulus and Entercom announced an agreement in which WHLL and WMAS-FM, as well as WNSH in New York City, would be swapped to Entercom in exchange for Entercom's Indianapolis stations. Under the terms of the deal, Entercom began operating WHLL under a local marketing agreement (LMA) on March 1, 2019. The swap was completed on May 9, 2019. On March 22, 2021, WHLL rebranded as "Hall of Fame Country 98.1".

On September 1, 2023, WHLL flipped to Spanish CHR, branded as "Nueva 98.1".

== FM translator ==
Call sign	Frequency	City of license	FID	ERP (W)	Class	Transmitter coordinates	FCC info
W251CT	98.1 FM	Springfield, Massachusetts	200871	250	D	42°6′33″N 72°36′38″W	LMS
