= WMAS-FM =

Adult contemporary radio station in Enfield, Connecticut

- Enfield, Connecticut; United States
- Broadcast area: Springfield metropolitan area; Pioneer Valley
- Frequency: 94.7 MHz (HD Radio)
- Branding: 94.7 WMAS

Programming
- Language: English
- Format: Adult contemporary
- Subchannels: HD2: Latin pop (WHLL)
- Affiliations: Compass Media Networks

Ownership
- Owner: Audacy, Inc.; (Audacy License, LLC)
- Sister stations: WHLL; WWEI

History
- First air date: 1947
- Former call signs: WMAS-FM (1947–1971); WHVY (1971–1973)
- Call sign meaning: WMAS (1450 AM) founder Alfred S. Moffat

Technical information
- Licensing authority: FCC
- Facility ID: 36543
- Class: B
- ERP: 50,000 watts
- HAAT: 55 meters (180 ft)
- Transmitter coordinates: 42.109°N 72.611°W

Links
- Public license information: Public file; LMS
- Webcast: Listen live (via Audacy)
- Website: www.audacy.com/947wmas

WMAS-FM (94.7 FM) is a commercial radio station licensed to serve Enfield, Connecticut. It airs an adult contemporary format and is owned by Audacy, Inc. The station's studios are at the Naismith Memorial Basketball Hall of Fame in Springfield.

WMAS-FM uses a directional antenna and broadcasts from a shorter tower than most Springfield FM outlets to avoid interference with co-owned WXBK, also on 94.7 FM, in the New York City market. WMAS-FM's transmitter is in Springfield's Brightwood neighborhood, off Plainfield Avenue (U.S. Route 20) and near the Connecticut River.

== History ==
=== Early years ===
WMAS-FM signed on the air in 1947 as the FM counterpart of WMAS (1450 AM). Both stations were owned by WMAS, Inc. and mostly simulcast their programming.

WMAS-FM was one of the first FM stations in Western Massachusetts. The studios were in the Hotel Stonehaven and the stations' city of license was Springfield.

=== Progressive rock and disco ===
The simulcast ended in the late 1960s. WMAS-FM became a "freeform" radio station, playing a progressive rock format. The programs were hosted by youthful disc jockeys (DJs) who could choose whatever they wanted to play. The progressive format was initiated by Hamilton K. Agnew, with an air name of "The Doktor". Brian Kreizenbeck joined the staff several months later. When Roy Cohn bought the station, Ham Agnew quit. He and Roy did not get along from the start. Advertising revenue came from the hippie boutiques, head shops, concert venues, and music stores that catered to the counter-cultural youth of the day.

This freeform radio format ended in September 1969 after complaints were made about expletives in a Wild Man Fischer song. A protest movement, in part organized by the DJs, failed to save the format. From 1971 to 1973, the station programmed a tamer album rock sound, using the call sign WHVY. Another reason for the impending failure was that Tony Gazzana wanted to change the format to milque-toast "Top Forty" format in addition to the stations call sign WHVY. Ham Agnew was also the licensed Chief Engineer of the station in addition to being the architect of the "Progressive-Free Form" format, and resigned shortly after a meeting with Roy Cohn and Tony Gazzana.

In the mid 1970s, the WMAS-FM call letters returned. Both the AM and FM stations were mostly simulcast once again, with a full service, middle of the road music format. In 1978, WMAS-FM hopped on the bandwagon of the disco music sound, although it was short-lived.

=== Adult contemporary ===
In 1979, WMAS-FM began airing a soft adult contemporary format, a forerunner of what the station is today. In June 2004, WMAS-AM-FM were sold to Citadel Broadcasting for $22 million; In January 2011, WMAS-FM agreed to change its city of license from Springfield to Enfield, Connecticut, to facilitate the relocation of WPKX (97.9) from Enfield to Windsor Locks; the deal, which allowed Citadel to use a generator owned by WPKX owner Clear Channel Communications in Albuquerque, New Mexico, did not require any changes to WMAS-FM's physical and studio facilities. Citadel merged with Cumulus Media on September 16, 2011.

The station won the Massachusetts Broadcasters Association Award for "Station of the Year" in 2012 and 2014. The Kellogg Krew Morning Show won the Massachusetts Broadcasters Association "Air Talent of the Year" award in 2013.

On February 13, 2019, Cumulus and Entercom announced an agreement in which WMAS-FM and WHLL, as well as WNSH in New York City, would be swapped to Entercom in exchange for Entercom's Indianapolis stations. Under the terms of the deal, Entercom began operating WMAS-FM under a local marketing agreement on March 1, 2019. The station's web presence moved to Radio.com a month later, along with its streaming. The swap was completed on May 9, 2019. Both Entercom and Radio.com changed their names to Audacy in 2021.
