= The Outpost (TV series) =

2018 American fantasy-adventure television series

- Genre: Fantasy-adventure; Drama
- Created by: Jason Faller; Kynan Griffin
- Starring: Jessica Green; Jake Stormoen; Imogen Waterhouse; Anand Desai-Barochia; Robyn Malcolm; Andrew Howard; Kevin McNally; Aaron Fontaine; Glynis Barber; Reece Ritchie; Izuka Hoyle; Jaye Griffiths; Adam Johnson; Georgia May Foote
- Composer: James Schafer
- Country of origin: United States
- Original language: English
- No. of seasons: 4
- No. of episodes: 49

Production
- Executive producers: Jason Faller; Kynan Griffin; Brett Bozeman; Jason Dreyer; Doug Pasko (2018); Jeff Swinton (2018); Zac Reeder (2018); Rachel Olschan-Wilson; Marc Roskin; Jonathan Glassner; Dean Devlin
- Producers: Jennifer Griffin; Jonathan English (2019–2021)
- Cinematography: John Lyde; Benjamin Allred; Joel Remke; Ty Arnold; Jeremy Prusso; Igor Šunter
- Editors: John Lyde; Andy Matthews; Michael Bradshaw; Kristi Shimek; Nikola Purić; Ana Žugić; Bojan Kosović; Nataša Pantić
- Running time: 40–43 minutes
- Production companies: Arrowstorm Entertainment; Electric Entertainment; Balkanic Media (2019–2021)

Original release
- Network: The CW
- Release: July 10, 2018 – October 7, 2021

The Outpost is an American fantasy-adventure drama television series, acquired by The CW, which premiered on July 10, 2018. It was produced by Syfy's international channels for international broadcast. The series was renewed for a third season in October 2019 which premiered on October 8, 2020. Ahead of the third-season premiere, the series was picked up for an additional 13 episodes which ultimately became the fourth season. In September 2021, the series was canceled after four seasons and concluded on October 7, 2021.

== Premise ==
My name is Talon. I'm the last Blackblood, or so I've been told. I escaped when Everit Dred killed all my people. I cut off the points of my ears to hide in plain sight. A tiny creature lives inside me, passed to me by my dying mother. It gives me the power to open portals to another world and summon powerful demons called Lu-Qiri. But I can only summon them when I have their names, something that's proving to be a challenge. The Prime Order wants me dead, but I've found sanctuary at the farthest edge of the Realm in a place known as The Outpost.

— Talon, 2nd season opening narration

"The Outpost follows Talon, the lone survivor of a race called Blackbloods. Years after her entire village was destroyed by a gang of brutal mercenaries, Talon travels to a lawless fortress on the edge of the civilized world, as she tracks the killers of her family. On her journey to this outpost, Talon discovers she possesses an extraordinary and mysterious supernatural power that she must learn to control in order to save herself and defend the world against a fanatical religious dictator."

=== Season 1 ===
In the first season, Talon's back-story is presented along with her journey to Galwood Outpost where she exacts justice on The Bones mercenary company responsible for killing her unarmed kinsmen. She forms friendships and alliances at The Outpost, discovers and begins to control her abilities, finds The Book of Names, and confronts the ambassador for the Prime Order, Everit Dred, who ordered the massacre.

=== Season 2 ===
Talon's enemies increase to include members of her own Blackblood race, complicating whom to trust. She learns there are at least two clans; the militant Black Fists who want to kill all humans, and her own pacifist ancestors who made peace. She discovers her power derives from the Asterkinj her mother gave her before dying, and there are as many as six other kinjes, each granting their host a different power. The Holy Three that rule the Prime Order each have a kinj of their own. The Outpost comes under direct attack by armies of the Prime Order, forcing Talon to decide whether or not to "summon slayers of men" thus fulfilling The Blackblood Prophecy.

=== Season 3 ===
With scores of blackbloods, including brutal blackfists, enslaving her human friends and associates, Talon must learn to walk a fine line between factions to prevent sectarian violence. With new threats from the United and remnants of the Prime Order, come new challenges, responsibilities and opportunities. She earns respect from the various factions who chant her name, asking for her leadership. When 60,000 United followers descend upon the Outpost, Talon aids Queen Rosmund in an heroic effort to defeat the self-proclaimed god Yavalla. Inhabitants bend the knee to Talon, whom everyone expects will be their new queen.

=== Season 4 ===
Talon grieves the loss of her friend Gwynn, while rebuffing Garret's attempts to crown her queen. Too late a new queen ascends, Falista, who becomes increasingly tyrannical and paranoid, poisoned by the Kultorkinj after Jaaris' demise. Talon meets young Luna, whom she takes under her wing and mentors, being reminded of her own youth. The Gods of old wake to threaten the Realm, and Falista plays straight into their hands, dragging Talon's friends into grave danger. She deals with guilt for having brought Yavalla from the Plane of Ash, and for not having brought the remaining blackbloods through before they were massacred by the blackfists. Talon investigates and opposes the so-called gods, who capture and torture her, to draw her friends to their deaths. Talon meets the progenitor of the Blackblood race, learning more about her ancestors, the Guardians of the Asterkinj. Armed with new knowledge, she and her allies defeat the gods. She marries Garret and is finally crowned Queen of the Realm.

== Cast ==
=== Main ===
- Jessica Green as Talon, a Blackblood survivor
- Jake Stormoen as Captain Garret Spears; son of Gate Marshal Wythers
- Imogen Waterhouse as Lady Gwynn Calkussar/Princess Rosmund/Queen Rosmund(seasons 1–3)
- Anand Desai-Barochia as Janzo; brewer, scientist, academic, inn owner and saviour of the realm
- Andrew Howard as Gate Marshal Cedric Wythers; father of Garret Spears (seasons 1–2)
- Robyn Malcolm as Elinor Chadwick/the Mistress/Royal Advisor/ Royal Treasurer (seasons 1–2)
- Kevin McNally as The Smith (season 1) (Note: McNally was credited as main cast for the first six episodes of the first season.)
- Aaron Fontaine as Lord Tobin Aegisford/King Tobin(seasons 2–4)
- Glynis Barber as Gertrusha (seasons 2–3) (Note: Credited as main cast only in the episodes in which they appear.)
- Reece Ritchie as Zed (seasons 3–4; recurring season 2)
- Izuka Hoyle as Wren/High Priestess (seasons 3–4)
- Jaye Griffiths as Yavalla/High Priestess (season 3)
- Adam Johnson as Munt (seasons 3–4; recurring seasons 1–2)
- Georgia May Foote as Falista (seasons 3–4)

=== Recurring ===
- Charan Prabhakar as Danno (season 1)
- Philip Brodie as Ambassador Everit Dred (seasons 1–2)
- Thor Knai as Kell (season 1)
- Cokey Falkow as Tiberion Shek (season 1)
- Michael Flynn as General Cornelius Calkussar (season 1)
- Elizabeth Birkner as Ilyin (aka. The Dragman) (seasons 1–2)
- Sonalii Castillo as Essa Khan (seasons 1–2)
- Medalion Rahimi (season 1) and Amita Suman (season 2, 4) as Naya
- Lilli Hollunder as Rebb (season 2)
- Jelena Gavrilović as Sana (season 2)
- Andreja Maricic as One (of the Three) (season 2)
- Jelena Stupljanin as Two (of the Three) (seasons 2–4)
- Eilian Wyn-Jones as Three (of the Three) (seasons 2–4)
- Dragan Mićanović as Captain Orlick (season 2–3)
- James Downie as Sammy/Alton (seasons 2–3)
- Patrick Lyster as Captain Weldon Calkussar (season 2–3)
- Tiana Upcheva as Warlita (seasons 2–4)
- Tamara Aleksić as Liecia (season 3) and Janya (season 4)
- Nikki Leigh Scott as Vorta (seasons 3–4)
- Milos Vojnović as Tera (seasons 3–4)
- Maeve Courtier-Lilley as Luna (season 4)
- Tamara Radovanović as Nedra (season 4)
- Pavle Jerinić as 313/Marvyn (season 4)
- Jovana Miletić as Levare (season 4)
- Srdjan Timarov as Kultor (season 4)
- Jovan Jovanović as Golu (season 4)
- Gerard Miller as Aster (season 4)

== Episodes ==
=== Series overview ===
Season	Episodes	Originally released	
Season	Episodes	First released	Last released
1	10	July 10, 2018	October 2, 2018
2	13	July 11, 2019	September 26, 2019
3	13	October 8, 2020	January 3, 2021
4	13	July 15, 2021	October 7, 2021

=== Season 1 (2018) ===
No. overall	No. in season	Title	Directed by	Written by	Original release date	U.S. viewers (millions)
1	1	"One Is the Loneliest Number"	John Lyde	Jason Faller & Kynan Griffin	July 10, 2018	0.77
Despite Erik's warning, Talon questions bar patron Gunter Donnelbrow about men who killed her family. Covenant soldiers intrude, killing gamblers. Gunter names two of seven tattooed mercenaries; Toru Magmoor at Galwood Outpost, and leader Tiberion Shek. Having fled, Erik is slain by greyskins. Talon sketches her brother Eremus, recalling their childhood blackblood village thirteen years prior, when The Bones slaughtered everyone. Shot by an archer, Talon's mother died summoning an otherworldly creature; Talon wills it to appear, saving herself. The archer tells Shek, "She's dead" as Prime Order Ambassador Everit Dred observes. Later, young Talon is found by Meadhbh, wife of peasant farmer Myron who worries for their children's safety. To protect them, Talon cuts the tips off her ears, disguising herself as human. Presently, Talon is saved from a plagueling attack by Captain Garret Spears, who vouches for Talon to his father, Gate Marshal Cedric Wythers. Garret explains, the Prime Order leaves the Outpost alone in return for armaments forged from their ore mines. For a barmaid job, Talon goes to The Nightshade Inn, where Lady Gwynn Calkussar enlists Talon's help; Talon stabs Magmoor, but is run-through herself. A mysterious hooded man carries her away. Dying, Magmoor writes with his own blood, "Tell Dred one remains...."
2	2	"Two Heads Are Better Than None"	Kurt Knight	Jason Faller & Kynan Griffin	July 17, 2018	0.64
...Marshal Wythers questions Munt at Magmoor's crime scene where black blood is found, about which Wythers' mute lieutenant Danno mimes, "demons." The mystery man, revealed as the Outpost's blacksmith, tends to Talon's wounds and tells her a prophecy, giving her a scroll to study. "When the moon is aflame, a blackblood will summon slayers of men to conquer and purge the oppressors of old." — The Blackblood Prophecy Garret resists Gwynn's amorous advances. Her father General Cornelius Calkussar, commander of The Outpost, plots with Garret to use the greyskins threat to requisition more troops, then use them against the Prime Order's tyrannous reign. Sergeant Raelius reports on plaugelings, as Kell snorts green-powdery colipsum to "kick you up a notch." Talon, still injured, hides in Janzo's brewery, where he heals her with alchemy. The Mistress of the Nightshade, livid about exorbitant colipsum costs, tasks her "son" Bill to discover Worm's supplier. Talon reads the scroll aloud, summoning a creature who then escapes. The Smith tells her it's a lu-qiri, which commoners call demons. Wythers, having trailed her blood, arrests Talon intent on executing her, fearing Prime Order retribution for Covenant officer Magmoor's death. Garret and Gwynn intercede, claiming self-defense. To Wythers' amazement, Gwynn orders her father, "Set her free." Later, Garret must kill his friend and fellow soldier Kell, who has transformed into a plagueling.
3	3	"The Mistress and the Worm"	Kurt Knight	Jason Faller & Kynan Griffin	July 24, 2018	0.64
Garret takes Kell's corpse to Janzo to analyze plagueling infection. Worm kills Bill for trailing him. Gwynn's lady-in-waiting Lilly delivers Talon an invitation to tea where they bond, and Talon cleans up, donning a new gown which earns her a job with the Mistress. Her other "son" Munt delivers Bill's head to the Mistress, a warning message from Worm. After the lu-qiri kills a washerwoman, dragging her corpse under Talon's window, Wythers tells Talon he's sent word to Everit Dred. "Good!" she replies, "Let them come." The Smith tells Talon to banish the lu-qiri (named Baphnoro), back through the portal to The Plane of Shadow and Ash, explaining, her black blood comes from Gezzekhan, the lu-qiri's Lord Emperor, but she must command without doubt, distraction or fear. Later, Talon saves the Mistress from being killed by Worm. The Mistress tells Janzo of her ambitions to control the world by cornering the colipsum market. Talon chases Baphnoro, but loses him on the parapet battlements, where she winds up flirting and challenging Garret to spar. Dred informs Shek that Magmoor is dead and orders him to bring him the head of the last blackblood, or suffer slow death by the Inquisitor.
4	4	"Strange Bedfellows"	John Lyde	Jason Faller & Kynan Griffin	July 31, 2018	0.61
Baphnoro strikes again, killing a poultry farmer. Garret and Talon spar and nearly kiss before Gwynn interrupts. After sex, Cedric asks the Mistress Elinor how Gwynn could order her father Cornelius to pardon Talon. Elinor says most people believe Cornelius Calkussar, the former King Ranulf's personal guard, was paid by the Prime Order to betray Ranulf. Cornelius' wife hanged herself in shame, and Gwynn was raised and educated by an expensive governess. In return for her identity, Elinor asks Cedric to arrest Worm so she can extract his colipsum supplier. Gwynn and Talon bond further over drinks and Octor gambling. Wythers confronts Talon about another corpse under her window; the poultry farmer. He orders her to leave the Outpost by sundown. The Smith tells Talon, Baphnoro hates her, but lets her live hoping she'll leave the portal open for more lu-qiri to enter and exact revenge for their banishment. Janzo discovers Worm communicates with his supplier by messenger birds. Elinor, no longer needing him, has Cedric execute Worm for Bill's murder. Talon confronts and fails to banish Baphnoro, who pierces her with his own sword-length talon.
5	5	"Bones to Pick"	John Lyde	Jason Faller & Kynan Griffin	August 7, 2018	0.60
Struggling back to her room, Talon discovers Baphnoro understands her ancestral language, but ignores her command, killing another townsman. During Kell's funeral, Cedric and Danno search Gwynn's chambers, finding her royal sceptre and signet ring. Lilly enters and screams. Cedric snaps her neck...accidentally? Janzo heals Talon's wound. Elinor orders Janzo to write the colipsum supplier since, "A man will sell his kids for a pinch of that green powder. That's power." Confronted with her royal heritage, Wythers blackmails Gwynn into sanctioning Talon's execution. As insurance, he prepared Prime Order dispatches for release upon his untimely death. When Tiberion Shek's "band of thugs" arrive, Wythers doesn't hand over Talon for torture, preferring a quick guillotine beheading. But Baphnoro arrives and grabs Wythers. Talon commands Baphnoro, "Let him go" and he obeys. Danno releases her as Garret enters. Shaken, Wythers tells Talon, "fix this...then you leave...." Shek visits the Smith, who's revealed as The Wolf, a Bones archer who failed to kill young Talon. Shek runs him through with his sword. Talon kills a Bones warrior in his sleep; Garret shoots another. She leads the remainder, including Shek, into the sewers where Baphnoro kills two more. Talon battles and kills Shek.
6	6	"The Book of Names"	John Lyde	Jason Faller & Kynan Griffin	August 21, 2018	0.56
Baphnoro displays his arm which saved young Talon from The Wolf's arrow. She wills the portal open, commanding Baphnoro, "go back." He obeys. Dying, the Smith claims he changed the moment he saw young Talon's eyes when the lu-qiri saved her. He quests her to fulfill The Blackblood Prophecy, etched upon a new sword he made her, and to find The Book of Names, warning, "You haven't much time...The Dragman will find you." With his truth-seer Ilyin, Dred interrogates shrine acolyte Karric Unger from Cardrian's Pass. Karric confesses the Vex Rezicon is inside the Altar of Fire. Dred kills Karric, his wife, and three children. Janzo continues plagueling research. Elinor orders him to buy colipsum at Gallows Rock. To Talon, Gwynn reveals she is Princess Rosmund, heir to the realm. Talon realizes she could summon more lu-qiri, reciting their names from the Vex Rezicon. In exchange for translating Yindrian, Talon protects Janzo against brother-sister musician/bandits Pack and Pock. Garret and Cornelius defeat Covenant Captain McNor's forces, while delivering armaments to Rosmund's new army, who bow to her as their Queen. Dred tasks Essa Khan to burn the Vex Rezicon at the Maer-Nokh shrine, returning one page as proof.
7	7	"The Colipsum Conundrum"	Kynan Griffin	Jason Faller & Kynan Griffin	August 28, 2018	0.64
Janzo tells Talon about becoming a brewer after Elinor sold his twin sister to slavers. After Lilly's body is found, Queen Rosmund sentences Wythers to "living death" in the mines, elevating Higgs to Gate Marshal. Prime Order loyalists conspire to warn Hamling of Queen Rosmund's army, but Raelius captures them. Janzo purchases colipsum, amazed the suppliers are greyskins who give twice the agreed amount. Dred receives word of The Bones' deaths. Ilyin seems alarmed that Dred is willing to kill every woman at the Outpost in order to eliminate the last blackblood. Rosmund prevents Raelius' torture of the loyalist, admonishing, that's "how the Prime Order treats prisoners." He declares, "Hail to the Three" before his summary execution for desertion. The rest, bowing to her relatively merciful justice, are granted clemency. Quarantined plaguelings escape, infecting Garret. In the mines, Rogan Three-Fingers beats Wythers, who is comforted by Sills on behalf of the Mistress. Dred prepares a battalion to march on the Outpost for failure to capture the blackblood and deliver armaments. Janzo manages to save Talon from a bone wolf attack with traptak bark fire. Garret chains himself in Janzo's brewery in case he transforms into a plagueling.
8	8	"Beyond the Wall"	Clare Neiderpruem	Jason Faller & Kynan Griffin	September 11, 2018	0.65
Marshal Higgs demands entry taxes from the returning Janzo. While Elinor is pleased, Janzo warns the greyskins remain "enemy of the realm...number one threat to humankind" and they shouldn't have anything to do with them. Janzo experiments to cure Garret of plagueling infection. Ilyin's eyes close and her head drops when Dred insists, the blackblood "must die for the sake of the living." Cedric finds a smugglers ledge, very high up on the Outpost's massive outer wall, facing greyskin territory, which Sill protects for Elinor's business interests. Gwynn learns of Garret's condition; Talon learns of Gwynn's love for Garret. Danno is enlisted as Gwynn's "eyes and ears" in The Watch. Talon, Janzo and Garret depart the Outpost to acquire the Vex Rezicon, forced through greyskin territory to reach Maer-Nokh Shrine. They're baited and attacked by greyskins; Janzo pours acid, saving them. That night, Garret and Talon nearly kiss again, but Garret pulls away, ostensibly because of his infection. With Garret chained away, Talon and Janzo snuggle for warmth as they sleep. Dred's battalion reaches the Outpost, and he kills General Calkussar; Gwynn is horrified. Her new handmaiden Naya comforts her, as Dred's men search everywhere for Gwynn and the blackblood.
9	9	"The Vex Rezicon"	Jason Faller	Jason Faller & Kynan Griffin	September 25, 2018	0.60
Janzo wonders why Garret hasn't "turned" after four days of infection. Meanwhile, Essa Khan burns the Vex Rezicon at Maer-Nokh. A giant lake-dwelling tentacled terapock attacks Garret, who Talon revives to life using Nordijorian cleric methods and kisses. Dred's men find Rosmund's royal sceptre and signet. In a ravine, Talon's party is knocked unconscious by greyskins. Dred's men slice women's hands, testing for blackblood, while Gwynn hears how poor Naya was growing up. Gwynn, trusting Naya, sends her to Danno for help. Naya informs Dred, who holds her sister and mother captive, but Danno and Cedric rescue Gwynn. Talon's party awakens, tied to posts; the greyskins' next meal. One offers Garret colipsum to snort. Talon asks why only Garret. Janzo thinks they smelled Garret's blood infection, and won't eat him. Talon summons Baphnoro to kill the greyskins. During their escape, greyskins kill Baphnoro. Janzo spots the shrine. Gwynn escapes through Sill's smugglers route while Wythers distracts Covenant soldiers. Marshal Higgs takes "spoils of war" from Elinor. Talon finds a crystal pendant hidden within the charred book; Janzo surmises it's the real Vex Rezicon, but how's it read? Wythers gathers townsfolk to fight back, but Naya informs Dred; Cedric and Elinor are shot.
10	10	"The Dragman is Coming"	Jason Faller	Jason Faller & Kynan Griffin	October 2, 2018	0.59
Janzo discovers the colipsum connection; colipsum being female fly eggs, fertilized by male plagueling parasites, causing colipsum users to transform – a greyskin-produced bio-weapon against humans. Garret hasn't "turned" because he doesn't snort colipsum. Dred captures Talon's party. He threatens their lives unless Talon recites the words to summon demons, thereby "proving" the prophecy's interpreted threat to all of humanity (rather than to only the "oppressors of old"). With Baphnoro dead, and no other name to summon, Talon knows nothing will happen. Dred breaks his word again, ordering them hanged. Disguised, the Queen's Army counter-attacks. Dred kills Raelius, but Talon defeats Dred in single combat. Queen Rosmund insists on a public trial before Dred's execution. She reinstates Wythers as Gate Marshal, who finds Higgs raiding The Watchmen's payroll. Danno takes a crossbow-bolt for Cedric, who kills Higgs. Janzo burns Elinor's colipsum, then translates, "Only the Dragman can hear the fire-song of the Vex Rezicon." Over the hearth-fire, they hear but don't understand. Naya releases Dred. Garret and Gwynn try making love, but Talon interrupts. Dred attacks, holding Janzo hostage, who burns Dred's face with the fire poker. Talon drives Dred away and cauterizes Janzo's wound. Season epilogue : Essa hands Dred the page, proving she burned the book. Elinor sends a message bird, intent on more colipsum. Naya, still undiscovered as a spy, attends Queen Rosmund. Garret assembles men to chase Dred, but Talon remains "to look after Janzo," whom she loves "as a brother." Ilyin arrives and begins writing as the fire-song emanates from the Vex Rezicon, announcing, "I am the Dragman."

=== Season 2 (2019) ===
No. overall	No. in season	Title	Directed by	Written by	Original release date	U.S. viewers (millions)
11	1	"We Only Kill to Survive"	Marc Roskin	Jason Faller & Kynan Griffin	July 11, 2019	0.61
At Dun-Ebdin, Garret's squad is ambushed. Garret defeats Dred, but Essa stabs Garret though the heart. Merrick escapes. The Dragman Ilyin gives Talon one lu-quiri name. A lu-qiri exits the portal...with a blackblood woman! Talon recalls hunting remmick. Myron taught, "We only kill to survive." A tattooed blackblood kills Myron and Medhbh, presuming them "savages" who took Talon's ears. "Your mother passed the Asterkinj to you, so you could pass it on to me." In self-defense, Talon slays him, echoing Myron's words. Presently, Talon cannot command the woman's loyal lu-qiri, named Ekkundi. Another tries the portal; Talon closes it. She learns she killed Varlek, the woman's brother. Ekkundi knocks Talon unconscious. Brogan reports to Elinor's sewers-based colipsum farm as her newest "son." Talon wakes; the woman tried taking her Asterkinj. Janzo suggests Ilyin left willingly. Talon learns of "hundreds of blackbloods in the Plane of Ashes." Talon reports to Queen Rosmund; Naya listens. Cedric leaves to retrieve Garret's body. Rosmund worries The Three know she rebelled. Naya suggests rallying Prime Order regional governors whose baronies were stolen. With Ilyin's generations-long "Purpose," the blackblood woman proposes, "time for a Pureborn to take the Asterkinj" from Talon...willingly, or "the painful way."
12	2	"This Is One Strange Town"	Marc Roskin	Jason Faller & Kynan Griffin	July 18, 2019	0.54
Rebb, the blackblood woman, tells Talon they entered the Plane of Ashes willingly, planning to reappear behind enemy lines to kill their human oppressors. But Talon's ancestors betrayed them, making peace instead. Rebb claims Ilyin agrees, and will remain with her. They battle. Talon is defeated and given time to "meditate." Rosmund gets drunk, despairing no governors will join her rebellion. Talon and Janzo encourage her. She orders Captain Orlick to ready defenses. An army arrives flying Aegisford's banners. Baron Rovannus' son Tobin enters the Outpost with his counselor Gertrusha. Tobin pledges his army on condition Rosmund marry him. She counters, her "betrothal is a card to be played," and "there are several cards...that could match." Tobin's former governess "Gertie" chats with her sister Elinor. Wanting to impress, Elinor increases colipsum sales; Munt protests it'll create more "plaguelings...people will die." At Tobin's advances, Talon challenges him to fight. Tobin quips, "This is one strange town." Rosmund orders Naya to make Janzo "into the man Talon needs in her life," romantically. Tobin laughs, striking Janzo; Talon trounces Tobin. Janzo calls Talon naïve for deciding to give Rebb her Asterkinj. Finding Garret's sword (not his body), Cedric wonders, "Is my boy alive?"
13	3	"Not in My Kingdom"	Jonathan Glassner	Jonathan Glassner	July 25, 2019	0.52
At the capitol, The Holy Three punish Dred for failing. He presents Garret as another "means" for success. To turn Garret against the "false queen," Sana, First Healer to the Court of The Three, treats Garret with "positive conditioning" to build him up. Alternately, Tormentor beats Garret as "negative conditioning" to tear him down. At the Outpost, Rosmund and Tobin spar verbally, then with cards. Finally, Rosmund replies, "Not in my kingdom!" While transferring her Asterkinj to Rebb, Ilyin warns Talon, who takes Rebb at knife-point to ward off Ekkundi. Ilyin leaves with Janzo, explaining Rebb's mind is full of lies, and Ekkundi's name was taught by her mother and grandmother, not from the Vex Rezicon. Together they write new lu-qiri names. Rebb petitions Rosmund to gain control of Talon's Asterkinj. Talon asks Gwynn to trust that she's "got her back." Finally, Rebb kills Ilyin and burns the new names. Janzo finds one remaining, clenched in Ilyin's hand. Talon speculates it's "one of Rebb's evil friends." Tormentor goes too far, killing Garret. Two revives Garret. One warns the army will march on the Outpost; they have five days to succeed. Sana assures, "Garret Spears will be yours to command."
14	4	"Regarding the Matter of Garret Spears"	Jonathan Glassner	Jason Faller & Kynan Griffin	August 1, 2019	0.65
Imprisoned, Dred tells Garret he saw Princess Rosmund's childhood portrait, her face misshapen by a bucking horse. Tormentor gives Dred a bigger cell for his lie. A nurse tells Garret about the murals plastered over by the new regime. Sana delivers a forged letter from Queen Rosmund, "Regarding the matter of Garret Spears, I already have a new base commander." Garret finds "Rosmund's" mural, and begins to believe their lies. Tobin's gift offends Rosmund, even more when he tries re-gifting it to Naya. Gertrusha fails to get information about Rosmund's finances from Elinor. With Ekkundi, Rebb takes Gwynn hostage, demanding Talon's Asterkinj. Tobin, drunk, is no match for Ekkundi. Still unsure who she's summoning, Talon opens the portal. Lu-qiri Vikka exits with blackblood Zed, who says Rebb leads the militant Blackfist clan, and she killed his sister. Talon bargains to use Vikka to rescue Gwynn. While Vikka battles Ekkundi, Talon finally slays Rebb, ending her threat. Talon takes Zed to the Nightshade to catch him up on three-hundred years of history he's missed, since time passes more slowly in the Plane of Ashes. Sana, having seduced Garret, takes him before The Three, to whom he pledges "heart and blood."
15	5	"The Blade of the Three"	Orsi Nagypál	Katherine DiSavino	August 8, 2019	0.63
Queen Rosmund orders Talon to send Vikka and Zed back through the portal, and says she's not desperate enough to marry drunken, lecherous, dishonorable Tobin. Naya kisses Janzo, and inadvertently suggests sunlight might cure plaguelings. Elinor trades her ill-gotten wealth to pay miners, provided Rosmund appoint her Royal Advisor. Rosmund calls her a criminal. Elinor retorts, in war "you need a criminal." Now Treasurer of the Realm, Elinor puts Janzo in charge of the Nightshade. Desperate, Gertrusha severely scolds Tobin, "By hook or by crook...I will make you a king." Zed finds "The Key" sketch within the Smith's collection, claiming it "unlocks a great power" that could solve their collective problems. Naya tells Janzo, "You don't need fixing," calling him, sweet, kind, caring, funny and brilliant, "what most women want." Tobin humbles himself before Rosmund, pledging his army "for the right reasons." Meanwhile, with her hold slipping, Sana orders Garret, "take your medicine." Garret arrests Cedric, asking Sana to "fix him." Tormentor takes Cedric before The Three who test Garret, "kill your father." He does. They rename Garret, "The Blade of The Three," ordering him to "kill the blackblood...kidnap the false queen." He confirms, "Hail to The Three."
16	6	"Because She's Worth It"	Orsi Nagypál	Jason Faller & Kynan Griffin	August 15, 2019	0.60
Zed notices the Key's missing gemstone; Talon recalls Varlek's pendant. With miners striking, Elinor threatens the Foreman with plaguelings and appoints Munt as Tax Collector. With Vekka devouring livestock, Rosmund arrests Zed. Talon bargains to banish Vikka, with Zed remaining; they leave to "find the missing piece to the Key." Asking why he should still woo Rosmund, Gertrusha answers, "Because she's worth it, Tobin." It's revealed Tobin's sister was slain by the Prime Order. He vows, "To put an honest and compassionate leader in their place. That will by my legacy." Gertie and Elinor conspire to attract other suitors to wed Rosmund and join the rebellion. Elinor suggests Tobin's cousin, Milus Aegisford. Munt and Janzo tie plaguelings down in open sunlight to test reactions. Learning of a traitor, Tobin suspects Naya upon receiving her next message from the capitol (reminding that her family is still hostage, pending her espionage). Tobin tasks the Post Master to intercept her messages, and he questions Naya. Rosmund urges Tobin to make peace with Milus, entreating him to ally against the Prime Order; Naya eavesdrops. While hunting, Talon sees Garret and they embrace; Garret surreptitiously stabs her.
17	7	"Where You Go, People Die"	Milan Todorović	Jason Faller & Kynan Griffin	August 22, 2019	0.65
Garret exclaims, "Wherever you go, people die!" Badly wounded, Talon escapes through the portal to the Plane of Shadow and Ash. Janzo finds a plagueling woman cured. Noticing flowers nearby, he tests them on two others not yet cured. Rosmund brings food, and Tobin kisses her. Feeling guilty, Naya admits her espionage to Janzo, who argues she turn herself in. She destroys her next missive, but she's observed. Given an ultimatum, Naya tries leaving the Outpost, but Tobin arrests her. Rosmund wants Naya executed immediately. Elinor advises they first determine what she knows. When blackfists try to kill Talon, she exits the portal. Finding Zed, they return to the Outpost to intercept Garret from kidnapping Rosmund. Bargaining for Milus' allegiance and army, Rosmund promises him all Aegisford's lands, including Tobin's as Tobin won't need it once they marry. Janzo pleads mercy for Naya, in vain. He bribes guards Partridge, Griffin, Varna, and the Deputy Marshal with free drinks...laced with cinder moss, knocking them out. Naya escapes the Outpost. Garret interrupts the wedding, claiming Rosmund's in danger. She trusts and leaves with Garret, who's convinced she "knew I was alive" but "just didn't care."
18	8	"A Crown For the Queen"	Milan Todorović	Katy DiSavino	August 29, 2019	0.48
Covenant soldiers bind Rosmund. Garret, seeming unsure, quaffs another vial of "medicine." Talon goes after Garret...Tobin follows. Displaying a bag, Garret mocks, "A crown for the queen." Talon takes on six soldiers while Tobin fights Garret. Gwynn is taken away, but she knocks Garret off their horse. Talon chokes him unconscious. The one-eyed archer shoots four arrows into Tobin before Talon kills him. Rosmund pulls the arrows; Talon cauterizes his wounds. Janzo finds one of two remaining plagueling men cured. Garret is imprisoned. Janzo tends to Tobin. Talon confronts Zed for not helping Rosmund, leading to Tobin's wounds. Zed recounts his struggles on the Ash Plane, having to ally with blackfists for survival. Rosmund visits Garret's cell. She sends for Janzo, asking "fix him" realizing the Prime Order "tampered with his mind." Knowing he freed Naya, Rosmund assigns guards to Janzo, deferring his sentence for betraying the Crown. The Three receive word of Garret's failure, and summon their generals to attack Rosmund's forces. Janzo, having done more research, thinks Talon's Key belongs to the Vor-Anden Shrine. An unknown soldier delivers Garret's meal, signaling him to prepare for escape. Talon and Zed leave to find the Key's missing gemstone.
19	9	"There Will Be a Reckoning"	Dusan Lazarevic	Jason Faller & Kynan Griffin	September 5, 2019	0.64
Zed kills a bone wolf stealing a human baby. While the mother is grateful, the father says, "Don't talk to it." Zed, "save their baby...still they hate you." Talon, "They're afraid." Zed, "Must be these terrifying pointy ears." After the botched wedding, Milus leaves to "take what's mine. There will be a reckoning." Talon and Zed make love. In the morning, the father brings ten Covenant soldiers. The blackbloods defeat them. The unknown soldier smothers Janzo, who splashes him with caustic liquid. Munt takes him to the colipsum farm for interrogation. Tobin's sends his army back to protect his lands; Elinor sends Munt to spy on "Auntie Gertie" at Aegisford. Milus doubles-back to capture the Outpost, demanding the false queen Rosmund. During parley, Milus offers returning Tobin's lands in exchange for delivering Rosmund to Milus for the Prime Order. Elinor sends Brogan over the wall to sell two bricks of colipsum to Milus' army. Janzo gives Garret an antidote after finding his "medicine" supply...nyassa root, for pain, sleep, pliancy, and susceptibility to suggestion. At Varlek's grave, Zed puts the gemstone into the Key.... Garret insults Lomack to bait him in order to escape since Garret has "a job to finish...."
20	10	"The Only Way"	Dusan Lazarevic	Katherine DiSavino	September 12, 2019	0.63
Garret tries to kill Rosmund, but Janzo's antidote takes effect. Garret finds her childhood portrait, confirming Dred lied. At Vor-Anden, honoring "the Seven Warriors of Old," the Key reveals Bellator's constellation, "greatest blackblood warrior." A pedestal rises with seven holes. A beetle injects a kinj into Zed, one of five others granting "a different power." Garret leaves to take revenge on Sana and Tormentor. Dred admits killing Naya's family; Naya stabs him through his cell bars. After Janzo finds Elinor's colipsum farm, Rosmund unleashes plagueling chaos upon Milus' army. Zed telepathically wills a Covenant soldier to harm himself. He plots to use his new power on Rosmund. Tobin finds Milus "turned" and kills him, then claims Milus' lands, titles, and remaining army. Janzo's test plagueling stings Elinor; a new theory kills his patient. Zed mentally stops a greyskin from killing Talon. Having hid his power, Talon realizes, "I can trust humans more than any blackblood." Zed thinks, "Open the portal." Talon, "Mind control...and you'd use it on me?" They battle. Zed doesn't "want to fight" Talon, "You just want to use me." Zed, "It was the only way." For his betrayal, Talon opens the portal, banishing Zed.
21	11	"Nothing Short of Heroic"	Kurt Knight	Jason Faller & Kynan Griffin	September 19, 2019	0.66
Covenant Captain Angbar arrests Talon. Rosmund confiscates Elinor's colipsum proceeds and burns her farm, then receives word from Baroness Winnowmere of the Moor clans, "Loyal to the Crown." Alton arrives, claiming to be Rosmund's brother. Garret rescues Talon. They defeat the Covenant squad, and flee as another arrives. Rosmund tests Alton with childhood memories. Meanwhile, Elinor has turned plagueling. Tobin reveals he's fallen in love with Rosmund, and prefers her as Queen for her good qualities over Alton as King. Janzo discovers sting-fly bites, which cures Elinor. He collects a nest, which cures many new "recruits." Rosmund arrests Elinor for skimming taxes and colipsum trafficking. Naya escapes the capitol in a wagon carrying a Prime Order secret weapon. At court, Janzo reports, "I betrayed my own mother to support the crown." Rosmund concedes his, "work has been nothing short of heroic." She spares Janzo's life, but for allowing Naya, a spy and traitor, to escape, Janzo is imprisoned next to his mother. Garet and Talon infiltrate the capitol to exact revenge. While Naya observes from ground zero, One and Sana watch from the capitol, "a small demonstration of the weapon." It explodes, destroying a stone building.
22	12	"In The Worst Corner of My Memory"	Marc Roskin	Jason Faller & Kynan Griffin	September 26, 2019	0.59
Garret slays Tormentor, but Sana and One "The Bringer of Pain" are heading to the Outpost. Garret and Talon follow. Naya is imprisoned after telling Rosmund about the secret weapon. Janzo tries to convince Gwynn. Alton suggests enlisting Baron Fenray's alchemist Gladharbor, who countered such devices. Rosmund supplies 50,000 gold condors. At camp, Garet describes One's power, and Two had green subdermal light. Talon realizes, "A kinj? We have to stop them." Garet and Talon infiltrate to kill One, who activates his red kinj. Garret collapses, but Talon's Asterkinj protects her. She stabs One, knowing his kinj will die with him. After Elinor reveals she sold Janzo's twin sister to Ushi Dimweller, Naya's adoptive mother, Janzo and Naya are relieved they never consummated their love. Sana revives One...and receives his kinj. Alton prepares to leave with the gold. Captain Weldon Calkussar arrives, revealing, "you're not the son of Ranulf....the worst image forever set into the darkest corner of my memory is witnessing his death." Rosmund sentences Sammy/Alton to death for impersonation of royalty and conspiracy to usurp the throne. Sana, now garbed as one of The Holy Three, uses her kinj to punish soldiers who failed to protect One.
23	13	"This Is Our Outpost"	Marc Roskin	Jason Faller & Kynan Griffin	September 26, 2019	0.48
Rosmund pardons Elinor, Janzo and Naya. Garret and Talon return, reporting a 5,000-man army. Rosmund offers her subjects refuge at Aegisford, intending to defend it or die; "This is our home." They shout, "Long live the Queen!" A spy messages, "Civilians evacuated. 1000 soldiers remain." Talon tells Gwynn about Zed. Rosmund frees Sammy to fight the Prime Order who murdered his family. They abandon the gate to ambush the first wave. Sammy is wounded. Escaping with stolen gold, Elinor defends Janzo, but she's stabbed. Dying, she mentions the tunnels. With a massive mallet, Munt melees. Garret and Janzo infiltrate the enemy camp through the tunnels. Two more armies appear. The spy kills the gateman and opens the gates. With the gatehouse lost, they fall back to the keep. Talon, alone, recites, "a blackblood will summon the slayers of men...." Vikka steps through the portal. Zed calls more Lu-Quri joined by blackbloods to defend the gate. Garret confronts Sana, who sent her kinj "back to the Council of The Three where it belongs." Garret stabs her and lights the fuse on the device before jumping back down into the tunnels. It detonates, wiping out the Prime Order armies. Season epilogue : Rosmund welcomes Zed's people to her Outpost, but Zed retorts, "it's the other way around...." Lowered masks reveal tattooed blackfists. Zed declares all humans prisoner, insisting that because blackbloods built it, "This is our Outpost."

=== Season 3 (2020–21) ===
No. overall	No. in season	Title	Directed by	Written by	Original release date	U.S. viewers (millions)
24	1	"For the Sins of Your Ancestors"	Marc Roskin	Jason Faller & Kynan Griffin	October 8, 2020	0.46
Season prologue (39 days after events in "This Is Our Outpost") : Tobin, Weldon and the rest of the humans dig for the extremely rare crystal abracite, guarded by blackbloods. Garret attacks an overseer for beating Sammy. Garret is beaten in return. Zed stops the beating while Talon watches helplessly. Zed tries to reign in blackfist Yobahn's mistreatment as per Yavalla's orders. Talon warns Yobahn not to execute Queen Rosmund. Later that evening : With Rosmund asleep, Kezzun Rah whispers, "For the sins of your ancestors," but Zed thinks, "Remove your sword." Yobahn tells Zed his kinj can't stop all blackfists and seven lu-qiri. Yobahn would torture Talon's friends, forcing her to open the portal for Yavalla, the last blackblood prophetess. Yavalla's daughter Wren "requisitions" Janzo's lab. Four blackbloods and Yobahn challenge Zed for leadership. Talon helps defeat them. Garret and Tobin smuggle Rosmund outside the Outpost, but a lu-qiri stops them. Yobahn wants all three executed. Talon objects; killing Rosmund will incite a revolt. Zed compromises, "Execute the two men." Talon stops them, "I'll bring Yavalla through." Yavalla tells Rosmund she'll deal with her blackbloods, and her intentions are "peace and unity for blackbloods and humans alike." Yavalla asks if Talon really thinks, "the Prime Order are the oppressors of old?" She reveals, there's another Plane opposite Ash, "a fertile paradise." The Outpost is vital to getting there. "A kinj," Talon realizes. Yavalla tells Queen Rosmund, there's a blackblood citadel underneath them. They agree to cease hostilities. Using intelligence from Rosmund's handmaiden Warlita, Garret kills Kezzun, "For the Queen."
25	2	"The Peace You Promised"	Milan Todorović	Jason Faller & Kynan Griffin	October 15, 2020	0.59
Garret is captured after killing Kezzun. Yobahn tries to lynch him. Again, Zed intercedes. Yavalla tries and sentences Garret "to death by drowning," the "tradition of our ancestors." Janzo provides a sleeping-death elixir, which Talon transfers by kissing Garret. In the tunnels, Munt administers the antidote. Once alone, Talon and Garret make love. Janzo examines Wren's alchemists meld-box; covered in skulls, it seems a dire warning. Asked what she's "really doing here," Yavalla deflects, claiming Talon's mother sent her father Saivek Redwan into the Ash Plane. Yavalla presses Wren to open the box, because failing, "this world will...explode into war and death." Janzo provides the clue. "It's a map!" With Warlita's help, Rosmund strategizes with Tobin to raise an army in Aegisford. Yobahn intercepts Rosmund's return. Unarmed, Weldon defends her. Once she's free, Weldon tries ending hostilities, but Yobahn kills him. Captain Orlick holds Yobahn. Rosmund accuses Yavalla, "Is this the peace you promised?" Yavalla sentences Yobahn to "the same justice" as Garret; drowning. Jobin escapes with Munt through the smugglers route. Wren and Janzo follow the map to the Smith's where Talon meditates. Beneath the sand of the hearth is a doorway down to "what will free us all."
26	3	"A Life for a Life"	Milan Todorović	Jason Faller & Kynan Griffin	October 22, 2020	0.43
Talon, recognizing the meld-box, insists on descending with Yavalla, Wren and Janzo. Zed accuses Rosmund of scheming war. Vikka receives Tobin's scent to track. Yavalla triggers a trap, sealing them below. They must solve riddles to escape death and advance. Subsequent revelations include: Yavalla claims Saivek gave the meld-box willingly, dying of disease; human Yindrians lived alongside blackbloods centuries ago; trapped chambers are testing their character; Yavalla is ruthless. Rosmund poisons Zed, demanding Vikka's recall, threatening, "a life for a life...blackblood justice." Munt hammers Vikka downhill. They escape on Woodcutter Gibley's horses. Finally, Talon evades darts, blades, and collapsing floor (to the citadel below). Yavalla receives an orange kinj. Jobin and Munt reach Aegisford, meeting Captain Jarom and Lumus. Yavalla declares, "blackbloods, humans, a new era has begun." With Tobin safe, Zed demands the antidote. Rosmund, "for what? Willow bark? ...for my headaches." Yavalla's kinj creates another kinj, glowing white. The orange kinj goes into Rosmund. Yavalla, "we are at peace...glad you have joined us." Rosmund, "As am I." Yavalla, "I see with your eyes, hear with your ears...think with your mind." Rosmund, "I feel with your heart." Yavalla realizes Garret lives, "he must join us." Rosmund, "Yes, High Priestess."
27	4	"The Key to Paradise"	Orsi Nagypál	Jonathan Glassner	October 29, 2020	0.44
At the Nightshade, acting strangely...intoxicated, Gwynn joins Talon and Janzo, suggesting Garret come out of hiding. Talon protests, blackfists want him dead. Elsewhere, hazy-eyed Yavalla asks, "Where is Garret Spears?" Gwynn echoes word-for-word. Talon, "He's in the sewers." Garret and Talon battle five blackbloods. Talon confronts Gwynn, who seems herself, until Yavalla takes control. Rosmund passes a kinj to Sammy, "glad you could join the United." Rosmund commands, "spread the gift." Wren ponders biological, epidemiological or chemical problems with human-blackblood "interaction," and proposes testing...strictly for science; Janzo, "I love science." Yavalla tries "joining" Talon to the United, but her Asterkinj fights back. Garret tells Talon about Sammy "joining" a blackblood. Janzo recognizes hive-mind similarities, but Zed is incredulous. Having given her mother "the key to paradise" Wren wants an apology as Yavalla was "prepared to leave me down there to die." Yavalla tries Uniting Wren, who escapes. She tells Janzo; Zed overhears and believes. At Aegisford, with only one-hundred fighting men, Gertrusha suggests Tobin marry Falista. But Tobin loves Rosmund. He tries buying her 2,000-man army. She's doesn't need money. Tobin marries Falista to save Rosmund. Tobin's army arrives at the Outpost. Yavalla instructs Rosmund, "Go...Give him the gift."
28	5	"Under Yavalla's Control"	Orsi Nagypál	Laura Whang	November 5, 2020	0.44
Rosmund's tries Uniting Tobin. Talon and Garret capture him, explaining, "Gwynn is under Yavalla's control." Yavalla tells Rosmund, Talon and Zed must die since they cannot be United. Talon's companions capture Gwynn, drawing Yavalla's United into battle. Zed thinks, "Stop" to a blackblood, but Yavalla resists. Talon accidentally kills Sammy. Gwynn concedes, "You deserve to die." Yavalla submits, "Enough!" They are jailed. Zed's concerned Wren isn't objective about Yavalla. She assures, she'll do what's necessary, but Janzo's theory (killing the "hive queen") drives Wren away. Rosmund's multiplied kinj causes pain; Yavalla supplies a rat host. Yavalla grabs Garret, who stabs and kills her....but she rises! Through the rat, Yavalla Unites Tobin, and they escape. Finally, Wren tells Janzo she loves him. Zed restrains blackfist vengeance upon Garret, insisting they stop Yavalla. Wren supports him. Talon, reminding them of her allegiance and goals, human-blackblood harmony, proposes, "Why don't we just do it? We don't need Yavalla." A blackblood suggest Talon should lead. They chant, "Talon! Talon! Talon!" Zed reminds, blackfists are slave to none, including Yavalla. They submit...for now. The rat approaches Wren; Janzo captures it, realizing, it's United. Talon deduces, they're heading to the capitol, Uniting more, including Liecia's village....
29	6	"Kill the Rat, Kill the Kinj"	Jonathan English	Jason Faller & Kynan Griffin	November 12, 2020	0.42
At Liecia's village, Talon confirms Yavalla's United are spreading. Zed wants to kill them; Talon prevents it. Janzo and Wren experiment on infected rats. Munt hires Warlita as Nightshade barmaid / rat-catcher. Talon is forced to kill an old farmer trying to Unite a child. Wren devises a means to detect the United; Talon uses it on Lutza. Janzo explains, when United die the kinj dissolves, "it's like kill the rats, kill the kinj." Talon protests, killing is not a "solution." Meanwhile, Warlita finds a woman's severed hand, leading to Garret uncovering a lu-qiri worshipping cult, which Wren says predates their banishment. A horn-masked man abducts Warlita. Munt finds her brooch. Finding lu-qiri tracks, Zed suspects it's Yobahn's now masterless Xaba, and suggests ballistas; Talon prefers to tame her. Blackfist Orrin claimed (and sold) Yobahn's summoning ring. So, Talon tracks, confronts, and eventually bonds with Xaba. Cultists chain Warlita for sacrifice. Xaba arrives and cuts Warlita loose before attacking the cult leader. Talon stops her, and they're arrested. Talon claims Xaba's ring for herself. At the capitol, Covenant soldiers are United. Wren and Janzo estimate 20-30 days before Gwynn wastes away from kinj-degenerative effects....a few days more and she'll die.
30	7	"Go Ahead and Run"	Jonathan English	Jason Faller & Kynan Griffin	November 22, 2020	0.38
Two and Three send the Prime Order Commander to attack Rosmund and Yavalla. United, he assures, Yavalla comes in peace. Three uses his kinj to teleport. Two is imprisoned. Yavalla prefers "a bloodless takeover." Rosmund declares, "The Three" are now "The One...Yavalla. I am your Queen, but she is our God." Talon, Garret and Zed depart to kill Yavalla with Janzo's fulminate fire-bomb; Janzo assumes Outpost command. Jaaris, leading nine, United-slaughtering, Covenant soldiers, heads for the Outpost, where Liecia infiltrates. Jaaris renounces the Prime Order to gain sanctuary. Janzo soon regrets it. They assign themselves guardians of the food storehouse. Humans, blackbloods, and lu-qiri assemble to oust them. Janzo warns, "You can't win." But Jaaris' red kinj inflicts pain on them all. Janzo exclaims, "One!" Jaaris, "Kneel, or die." Seeing Wren's ears, Jaaris arrests all blackbloods. Talon's party finds Yavalla, but she's a decoy. Talon tells her, "those bodies are slowly dying." Yavalla responds ruthlessly, "as bodies die, others take their place." Soldiers arrive, so they flee. Wren gives Janzo three lu-qiri summoning rings; "Go hunt many meat bags...bring delicious animals for good mouth eating." Disguised, Talon's party infiltrates the Council of The Three and find Gwynn gravely ill.
31	8	"Dying Is Painful"	Milan Todorović	Laura Whang	November 29, 2020	0.25
Unable to find Yavalla, Zed throws the fire-bomb onto Yavalla's shrine. Talon and Garret use the distraction to take Gwynn and Tobin to prison. Jaaris commences gladiatorial games, eradicating blackbloods, and pains Munt to claim Warlita. Liecia, unable to reach Wren, infects Jaaris' soldier, against Yavalla's orders. Garret proposes killing Gwynn, thus her kinj, with Two reviving her; Two demands sanctuary at the Outpost. The caveat, Two must absorb another's life, "A soul for a soul," choosing an insane murderer. Through Gwynn's eyes, Talon tells Yavalla, "Go to Hell!" as she kills Gwynn. After her kinj excretes, dissipating, Two revives Gwynn. Tobin attacks, forcing Garret to kill him, "I know. Dying's painful." Two takes another prisoner, and revives Tobin. Talon's party escapes the capitol. Two says, they wouldn't have needed her, "if you hadn't brought the white kinj from the Plane of Ashes." Liecia tries Uniting Wren. Jaaris kills Liecia, then "volunteers" Wren to fight. Baroness Falista tries to intercede. But Jaaris replies, "Nobility is dead," only strength matters. Talon steps in and defeats him, saying his kinj "will die with you." Talon declares, "This will always be our Outpost!" The people cheer. However, the red kinj survives...Inside Falista.
32	9	"She Is Not A God"	Imogen Waterhouse	Jason Faller & Kynan Griffin	December 6, 2020	0.34
Falista introduces herself to Rosmund as Tobin's wife. Rosmund shows Jaaris' soldiers Two, "Look at her...weak...captive....an ordinary woman. She's not a god." Rosmund, as "rightful ruler of this Realm," grants pardon if they "swear your loyalty to me." Zed objects after they starved and murdered blackbloods. Rosmund reminds Zed, he did the same to humans. They pledge to serve her. Talon interrogates Two about the seventh kinj. After "encouragement" Two admits there once was a black kinj "with only one purpose...to kill." Talon, "Yavalla?" Two, "whomever its bearer touches." Two claims they've searched for centuries without success. The pardoned soldiers break Two out of prison. Rosmund dreams a way to find Yavalla via United memories. Janzo makes another bomb for Talon and Zed. Falista, angry with Tobin for inebriation, inadvertently pains him with her kinj. Janzo finds Ficter's sap on the meld-box map; Wren suggests it's an antidote. With limited doses, they successfully test killing the United kinj, saving its host. Wren, Janzo and Munt try to intercept Talon. Watching from a hawk, Yavalla delays Talon, sending soldiers. Wren announces herself to a villager who leads them to an ancient blackblood temple. United worshipers genuflect, "Hail, Wren, daughter of Yavalla."
33	10	"From Paradise to Hell and Back"	Kurt Knight	Justin Patridge	December 13, 2020	0.26
Wren reasons but Yavalla believes her destiny is, "The Bringer of Peace." Wren, "At what cost? ...they're all dying." Yavalla, United everyone "dies in paradise." Wren protests, she'd die within weeks. Yavalla counters, "You will be with me forever...eternally. I am a god." Wren injects Yavalla. Her yellow kinj dies; white remains. Before dying, Captain Orlick Unites Wren. Munt fights but he's outnumbered and United. Janzo flees with the last syringe. Tobin and Falista provide food, upsetting Rosmund for their perceived vainglory. Tobin thinks she's paranoid. Rosmund reminds, they've "gone to paradise and hell and back." Yavalla discovers how Rosmund beat death. Falista petitions Rosmund to appoint Tobin Chief Advisor. Rosmund suspects Falista's power-hungry. Tobin's romantic preference angers Falista, paining Rosmund. Janzo crafts another bomb. Zed burns Yavalla; Talon decapitates her. Janzo cures Wren. Somehow, Yavalla lives, fully restored. "You cannot kill a god....Kill the deniers." Talon's party escapes. Rosmund appoints Garret Chief Advisor. Falista's flabbergasted. Tobin, "Enough! Stop fixing this! Stop handling me!" He's had enough machinations by Gertrusha, Yavalla, Falista. He wants to make his mark on his own terms. Yavalla rallies her worshipers, Galwood Outpost is their greatest threat. Show them, "the power of the United."
34	11	"The Hardest Part of Being Queen"	Kurt Knight	Jason Faller & Kynan Griffin	December 20, 2020	0.32
Falista plays power games with Garret. Rosmund suggests she support, not hinder, survival. Falista genuflects, but Garret wisecracks about Tobin's love for Rosmund. Falista's kinj flares. Garret falls pained, then Rosmund. Falista's surprised-scared. Garret threatens, "try that again...I will kill you." Wren mentions Yavalla forcibly took Saivek's meld-box. Talon speculates he lives, knowing the black kinj's location. Wren says she'll need Ash Plane lava tube maps. Ana greets her husband Strom; United, she's denied entry. Tobin visits imprisoned Falista, who's crying, regretful. Higley Muggs sells United "miracle cures," which seemingly work. Janzo scoffs, "fraudster, crook..." Ana drinks one, but Unites Strom, who admits her. Rosmund rejects Tobin's plea, but visits Falista, "to judge me yourself?" Rosmund, "It's the hardest part of being queen." Considering herself dangerous, seeing Rosmund "wise, thoughtful...dignified," Falista grabs Rosmund to pass her the kinj, to "protect you from Yavalla...use it...for good." Rosmund, "I can't," she'd "be no better than The Three." She pardons Falista. Wren insists on accompanying Talon to "handle" Corven, Zed's younger brother. Falista admits being wrong to come between Tobin and Rosmund, releasing him from marriage vows. Janzo reveals Higley's fraud. Strom Unites another gatesman, admitting followers to "conquer this Outpost."
35	12	"Where Death Lives"	Milan Todorović	Jason Faller & Kynan Griffin	December 27, 2020	0.31
In the Plane of Ash, crazy Corven attacks Zed. Only Wren convinces him to stop. Munt pounds the gate for Janzo to let him in....at Yavalla's command. Ana and Strom continue Uniting inhabitants. Tobin tells Rosmund he'll honor his vows with Falista. Shown his map, Corven exclaims, "That's where death lives." He won't take Wren down. But he'll take his brother Zed, with whom he's angry. Wren explains Corven's condition was her fault, saving his life with untested methods. Scales tipped, Yavalla sends hundreds of United. "Bring the Outpost into my fold." Asked, when's the wedding, Tobin says he's already married and loves Falista. Corven reneges and won't lead Zed. Wren also reneges and goes down, forcing Corven. Janzo sees the open gates, and Warlita's kinj. He warns Garret. They fall back to the keep. The Gate Marshall and Falista's bodyguards attack her. She pains them, locking herself away. Tobin rescues her, but he's stabbed and shot. Dying, Tobin tells Falista, "Use your power to protect the queen." Wren finds Saivek, pinned by spears, barely decayed. Zed wants to give him a proper burial. Saivek shouts, "Don't touch me! I'll kill you." Corven, "I told you. It's death."
36	13	"Violence Is Futile"	Milan Todorović	Jason Faller & Kynan Griffin	January 3, 2021	0.29
Four months ago : Yavalla waited "long enough." Saivek warns, only "death for you," touch-killing three blackbloods. Tridents pin Saivek down. Yavalla, "The box." Saivek, "Never." A serpent bites Corven. Yavalla takes the meld-box. Saivek warns, "It's a curse...It will end with death for everything...Even you." Yavalla, "we will take back what we lost." Present day : Saivek, "He's right. I am death." Talon, "...the black kinj." They explain, Yavalla's conquering the green world. Saivek disbelieves his wife opened the portal. Outside the keep, Yavalla/Munt says, "This violence is futile!" How many more deaths? Let them freely choose. Rosmund scoffs, freedom while enslaving minds? Saivek says his black Terakinj and Yavalla's white kinj will destroy each other's hosts. Talon and Saivek talk heart-to-heart. Yavalla's United attack. Ana attacks Rosmund. Falista focuses pain, saving Rosmund...Garret... Janzo...her primal scream drops scores, before she's shot. Janzo, now United, bludgeons Falista. Yavalla sends another wave. Talon opens the portal and fights. Garret, United, battles Zed. Yavalla, spotting Saivek, calls her lu-qiri, Ketma. Saivek tries touch-killing Ketma, but Saivek's thrown, skewered, stuck. Wren threatens suicide, stopping Yavalla. Talon battles Ketma. Rosmund tries freeing Saivek. Xaba arrives, saving Talon. Janzo Unites Wren. Zed is defeated. Unable to free Saivek, Rosmund receives his Terakinj. Talon objects, who'll rule if she's lost? Rosmund, "You'll figure it out." Yavalla declares "Victory." Talon slashes a path...Rosmund leaps onto Yavalla, "You lose...Die, you witch!" They disintegrate. Their kinjes fly away. All United kinjes drop, restoring free will. Janzo checks Falista....she's alive. Everyone bends their knee to Talon. Season epilogue : From the hills outside the Outpost, Three asks, "What have they done?" Two, "They released the gods." The white Vortakinj flies underground to a sarcophagus, entering the horned being within...Vorta opens her eyes. The black Terakinj flies along the coast to another sarcophagus, entering the horned being within...Tera opens his eyes.

=== Season 4 (2021) ===
No. overall	No. in season	Title	Directed by	Written by	Original release date	U.S. viewers (millions)
37	1	"Someone Has to Rule"	Milan Todorović	Jason Faller & Kynan Griffin	July 15, 2021	0.45
Outpost inhabitants grieve Queen Rosmund, while Luna pilfers mourners. Garret tries crowning Talon. She leaves, "I'm not a queen." Two offers to revive Tobin's corpse, exchanging twenty souls. Falista can't, Tobin wouldn't agree. Falista says Talon rightly refused coronation. Zed reasons, "Someone has to rule." Vorta wonders if others returned. Tera, we'll find them...and rise again. Inebriated, Talon's attacked by Luna. Talon opens a portal; Vorta says, "I hear you, betrayer...you will pay..." Lu-qiri aren't answering summons. Falista pains Outpost and Covenant soldiers vying for control; Vorta says, "Kultor, I see you. Come and take your place with us." Garret's concerned Falista nearly killed "drunken brawlers." Falista badmouths Rosmund, concluding she has royal right, power, and courage to use it. Talon still rejects coronation. Talon defeats Luna, claiming Talon murdered her sister Ilyin. She tells Luna about Rebb. Wren spots lu-qiri; Talon's whistle-ring is ignored. They scatter Saivek's ashes. Talon informs Garret, "I'll be queen" to prevent Falista's ascension until someone better is found. Two revives Tobin; Vorta says, "I see you, Janya." Garret tries crowning Talon again. Falista, Tobin, Two and Three appear. Tobin declares Falista, Queen of the Realm. She declares Tobin King, and Two and Three advisors.
38	2	"A Throne of Our Own"	Orsi Nagypál	Jonathan Glassner	July 22, 2021	0.45
Garret asks Falista, reject evil Two and Three. Ignored, Garret attacks. Three teleports. Falista pains Garret. Talon, "stop...killing him!" Falista questions Talon's loyalty. Garret's arrested. Two shouts, "Hail Queen Falista and King Tobin!" Everyone bows...lastly, Talon. Two wants Garret executed. Tobin warns against martyrdom. Falista supports Tobin. Two suggests joint-rule. Tobin reminds, Falista's queen, I'm king, "You are nothing." Three, "We, are The Three," teleports-dagger-at-Tobin's-neck. Falista commands "Return his blade." Three looks at Two, complying; "Don't forget," I can kill...anytime. The Prime Order Commander closes the Nightshade. Imprisoned, Luna and Garret chat. Tobin warns of false gods, but Falista "saw them" (Vorta, Tera); "I'm One." Yet again, Zed manipulates Talon to summon blackbloods. Tobin confides in Garret, who'd follow Tobin and Falista; never The Three. Xaba kills humans. Zed think-stops Vikka; Vorta, "we reconnect...I've missed you...we'll be together." Zed and Talon consult Wren about visions. Janzo learns, Wren's pregnant. Luna tries assassinating Falista to repay Talon. Two implicates Garret. Three orders "military crackdown." Talon sketches Vorta. Wren reminds Zed, scientists study, High Priestesses can't "mystically" transfer mother-to-daughter. Three orders Garret's execution. Falista pains Three, who teleports-dagger-at-Falista's-neck; Tobin stabs Three, transferring yellow kinj. Two humbles herself. Falista, "We are The Three."
39	3	"The Gods Thank You"	Orsi Nagypál	Rebecca Rosenberg	July 29, 2021	0.45
Tobin learns his new power; Vorta, "Levare. Come to me." Tobin appoints Munt manservant/advisor; Garret, Gate Marshal. Falista invites Talon, Wren, and Zed for tea...and treaties. Wren accepts her title, High Priestess, bargaining for blackblood land and equality. She'll need Yavalla's historical/cultural texts. Janzo begins bootlegging. Luna, fleeing Garret, discovers Two's twenty slaughtered soldiers. Garret protects Luna. Falista pain-kills an "unruly" man; Vorta, "We will be reunited...." Falista, "gods have spoken...I have heard..." Garret confronts Tobin with Two's mass-murder. Tobin wants the assassin, or Garret re-jailed. Two uses Falista's incident to imprison the disloyal. Ash Plane lu-qiri and blackbloods are found massacred...by blackfists. "Issa, what have you done?" Wren kills Issa; Zed, another two blackfists. Wanting alcohol, Tobin inadvertently teleports into Vorta's chamber. Her sarcophagus is open, but she remains trapped behind a seven-sided-shield having seven sigils surrounding a central sigil. "you have come...time to wake you." Tobin, begging his kinj, teleports away. Falista, "You visited the gods." Tobin, "a monster." Falista believes it's a "sign" the "right path," we're "chosen...our divine right....destiny." Corven provides Yavalla's texts. Blackfists shoot Wren; Nedra kills them, revealing the children. Corven dies heroically, protecting Zed. Two absorbs prisoners' souls, "The gods thank you."
40	4	"Going to Meet the Gods"	Kurt Knight	Justin Partridge	August 5, 2021	0.33
Two announces, "I'm going to meet the Gods." Garret plots "Freedom from Tyranny." Talon returns with blackblood children. Tobin's appalled...wagon-loads of Two's mass-murdered prisoners...Falista, "Traitors." Falista appoints Talon blackbloods' Governor, if she follows her. Talon recognizes Falista's altar, "The Mark of the Seven." Falista assumes Gods want their collaboration. Talon rejects they're Gods. Falista's anger/kinj flares; Vorta, "Prepare the way. Unlock the Skevikor." Wren explains the "mark." Before blackbloods, The Seven ruled, then left, our world. Talon and Zed track Two, investigating what requires stolen souls. Tobin's appalled...Falista will execute "very young" Luna. Deducing Garret's protection, Tobin provides Guard scheduling, indirectly helping Luna escape. Merrick reports Janzo's speakeasy...everyone's arrested. Convinced Gods inspired Blackblood Law through kinj-bearers, Falista revokes Janzo's execution provided Wren explains "Skevikor". "I don't know." Falista pains Janzo. Wren yells Stop! She'll research, but needs Janzo's Yindrian translations. Falista, "...two days." Two enters the underground. Zed thinks Vikka away; they follow Two. To Janzo, Wren admits lying to Falista; Skevikor "means the end of the world." Falista learns Luna escaped again, increasing paranoia, "co-conspirators are many...powerful....kill them all." Two approaches. "Janya. My body... is weak. Its restoration needs hastening." Two's stolen life-force enters Vorta, who exits the sarcophagus.
41	5	"They Bleed Black Blood"	Kurt Knight	Jason Faller & Kynan Griffin	August 12, 2021	0.49
Talon "Never heard of a god that needs healing." Vorta detects them. Talon and Luna hide. Lu-qiri grabs Zed. Vorta telekinetically collapses their hidey-hole. Janzo finds blank pages Wren can read, "wisdom given only to a High Priestess...from the god who walked amongst men." Luna extracts sigil-shield gems. Talon looks for Zed. Wren recalls symbols below the Smith's. Hero Belator's key opens another chamber; seven-sided altar, seven sigils on hand-shaped depressions, central recess...for a key? Wren posits it's the Skevikor. Talon follows Vorta to Tera. Two absorbs Vikka, reviving Tera, who steps out, "I live again." Tera disintegrates Two, whose kinj flies. "Go home, Janya, and rise again." Vorta, "Janya's soul is free." Tera looks at Zed, "brother Golu cries for release." Talon stuns them to escape. Luna's arrows hit Tera. Talon, "They bleed black blood." Luna hits Vorta, who telekinetically sends Luna's fourth arrow back. They flee. Falista's bodyguard follows Wren. Falista overhears them "working against me." Meanwhile, Munt woos Warlita, who advises "stop listening to the king. He's an idiot." All kinj-bearers receive Vorta's instructions to meet the gods. Talon, surmising they'll be killed like Two, warns hopelessly-deluded Falista, who chains them for her pilgrimage to the capitol.
42	6	"All We Do Is Say Goodbye"	Imogen Waterhouse	Rebecca Rosenberg	August 19, 2021	0.45
Talon, "This journey is a death sentence." Falista's oblivious. Janya flies beneath the capitol...her eyes open. She absorbs citizens' souls and steps out. Luna finds Janzo finding a lever that Luna leverages lighting a huge chamber and pictographs, recognizing one. Learning Garret's imprisoned, she frees him. Wren and Janzo discover a...cocoon? Thousands! Garret and Luna free Talon and Zed. Falista, "Fix this!" Tobin teleports, defeating Garret. Talon urges, Falista's "not herself...poisoned by that kinj." Tobin knows it, shouting "I want my wife back!" He gives Garret his signet. "Lead the Outpost until we return." Luna says Dragman Sanctuary might have what Janzo needs. Splitting up, Garret says, "Talon...all we ever do is say goodbye." Another horned being is found inside the cocoon. Dead capitol citizens are everywhere. Tobin, "turn back, Falista" or "end up like them." Vorta, come, "I will lead you." Luna confronts corpses she hid beneath, escaping Everit Dred's massacre during Ilyin's abduction. Terra asks if they've unlocked the Skevikor. Falista reports the key's missing. Vorta needs "to awaken our kind and return their souls," showing lights within her. "...time for three to become five...to awaken our brother and sister...rejoin us, so we may rule this world together."
43	7	"The Power of the Masters"	Imogen Waterhouse	Jason Faller & Kynan Griffin	August 26, 2021	0.46
Janya calls to Kultor; Falista's kinj glows. Tera calls to Levare; Tobin's kinj glows. Falista, we're returning what's not ours. Vorta uses Falista's "good attitude" to think-call Zed and Talon, advising, be as wise...live in peace. Tera calls them, "stupid human...crops to be harvested." Tera disintegrates Falista, freeing Kultor. "Your turn, king." Tobin dismembers Tera's hand, then teleport-stabs. Vorta throws a boulder, Kultor throws flame. Tobin teleports outside....enraged! Janya knows the Key's location. Watching them leave, Tobin teleports. At the Outpost, Janzo updates Garret. Zed think-stops the creature, who asks how he has "the power of the Masters?" Janzo learns: his tattoo-name, 313; Masters he serves don't want peace; Vorta's telepathic voice is absent; his "cocoon" transmits a "naviaspore" via neck-hose, without which, he's alone....Alone....ALONE!" At Dragman Sanctuary, Luna recalls Dred taking Naya and the Key (cylindrical-headed staff). At Relman, Naya joins them; the Key's in Dred's Reliquary. She knows how enter, warning about Dred's zealot guards. Talon and Luna shoot two. Naya stabs a third, recalling how she killed Dred. Luna, "Well, now I owe you." Talon, "don't start that again." Luna, hearing whispers, finds the key. The Four arrive; Vorta, "You have something that belongs to us."
44	8	"The Pleasing Voice of the Masters"	Igor Ŝunter	Jason Faller & Kynan Griffin	September 2, 2021	0.39
Battling, the Four capture Talon. Tobin teleports, ordering Janzo, "Destroy this...key." Garret can't risk thousands massacring "human, blackblood, and greyskin." Trying to save 313's species, they need more study. Ned agrees. Garret, "Two days." Vorta strategizes, Levare, then Golu, lastly, "wake the Betrayer," Aster. Tobin considers dropping the key "into the sea...it's us or them." 313 calls a nightglow beetle "naviaspore." Janzo, Vorta orders you? 313, "The pleasing voice of the Masters." Janzo, "Yavalla's kinjes;" 313's a drone-slave. Ergo, the key wakes kahvi, Masters supply naviaspores. Wren asks why they slept. 313, to "awaken in paradise;" his "world was dead." Previously, the Ash Plane was green. Masters move, waking kahvi upon reaching each new world. Dragman Luna hears the key. Janzo, "Vex Rezicon...same origins." Luna writes seven "names...starting with Janya." Garret, "time's up." The smith, hammering the key, causes Luna pain. Kultor tortures Talon. Vorta, "bring yourselves to us." Tobin, "As king, it's my duty." Talon sees Vorta's naviaspores. Tobin teleports, freeing Talon. Tera disintegrates Tobin. Janya restores Levare. Vorta, "Now we are Five." Levare, trapped for eons, wants Aster's painful punishment. Janya reminds, Aster must "wake the kahvi to serve." Vorta tells Zed, "return to the fold, Golu."
45	9	"The Price of Immortality"	Igor Ŝunter	Justin Partridge	September 9, 2021	0.33
A peasant woman helps Talon for defeating Yavalla. Janya steals her life, and villagers', healing Vorta and Tera, whom Tobin wounded. "This is the price of immortality." Tera, "keep a reserve to wake the kahvi." Tera fireballs the village. Talon flees. Janya, this world will "feed us well for a long time." 313, "Masters...will use you all as fuel." Talon, "Sure, Janzo, no threat at all." She recounts Vorta's naviaspores. Janzo, "explains the tubes," beneath the altar. Zed, "seven handprints," requires all Seven to use? Talon and Zed test it...memories...human woman smiled at Aster...Golu controlled her...trying to stab her baby...Aster assaulted Golu...embraced her. Luna's pilfered Reliquary artifact screams...whispers. They learn about the Masters, "six departed one remained" teaching "the first blackbloods;" gemstone patterns marks tombs; Aster's at Vor-Anden Shrine; Golgu's near Galwood Outpost. Zed and Janzo suggest destroying their bodies. Talon and Wren posit Aster's an ally. Talon triggers memory...Aster found their world..."Zed's right. I need to kill it." She and Luna leave for Aster's tomb; Zed, Nedra and Munt, Golu's. Janzo encourages 313, "make a choice" of his own. Missing the "others," he escapes, activating the Master's device using Luna's names (in combination-lock order). Thousands of hibernation chambers open.
46	10	"Something to Live For"	Milan Todorović	Jason Faller & Kynan Griffin	September 16, 2021	0.37
313, "you will wake Lokma." They won't; 313 hitting Janzo to escape might've killed him. 313 knocks them out. Vorta knows, "The Skevikor has been unlocked." Janya sucks township souls...Enough for Golu, Aster, and nearly all kahvi. Levare and Tera hurry to "awaken Golu and find Aster." Nedra finds Golu's underground tomb. Talon finds "that jerk" Higley Muggs, "hustling more suffering people...charlatan" She warns, so-called gods approach...tell everyone...empty your villages...hide your families. Zed stabs Golu. Levare teleport-attacks. Munt mauls Levare. "To be absolutely sure," Zed burns Golu on a funeral pyre. Nedra's glad, seeing "more of this world...we have something to live for...." Restored by Janya, Levare teleports. Tera approaches. Splitting up, Munt and Nedra shell game Zed's kinj. Janzo warns it "won't survive!" 313 opens the cocoon, "Lokma" is "born of my seed." Wren, "lokma are children." Unfortunately, "he's dead." 313 attacks. Garret arrives. Levare stabs Munt, teleporting to find Tera. Munt passes it to Nedra, "Run." Levare and Tera kill Nedra, freeing Golu. Janya restores Golu, even from the ashes. "It took many lives...." Golu, "Then it is time." Vorta, "Golu has risen. We release the Asterkinj next to wake the Betrayer." Talon thinks they killed Zed.
47	11	"Guardian of the Asterkinj"	Jake Stormoen	Rebecca Rosenberg	September 23, 2021	0.35
Janzo explains why 313's "choice" was wrong. "I choose lokma!" Lavare teleports, freeing 313. Who knows of the Skevikor? Mentioning Wren's ears, Levare declares, "Abominations." We'll "kill them all....Terminate Janzo and Wren." 313, "I will not fail." Zed moves Munt via travois. Listening, Luna locates a blackblood seal. "Here lies the one whose blood forged our soul and made us stronger. Sleep in peace, Great Father, for all eternity. Only if black blood adorns these words do we call upon your soul to rejoin this world." — Aster's tomb seal Talon spills blood...A catafalque rises...Asters body. Talon draws steel...."Wait." Luna takes Aster's crystal, "This is what I heard." Talon handles it...memories... "Guardian of the Asterkinj, if you, the keeper of my essence, has uncovered my sleeping body seeking answers, then a time I hoped would never have come has descended upon us. The moment to awaken me has arrived. Reunite body and soul. Send the Asterkinj home." — Aster's life/memory crystal "He wants me to wake him." Wren won't let 313 hurt her child. 313 doesn't want to. Janzo, "You're not a slave." Choose. 313 admits, "mistake...wrong choice," warning Garret. Levare teleports; 313 grabs her. "Fascinating...free will." 313 stabs Levare, who teleports. Zed returns; Janzo helps Munt. Wren suggests a "real name" that 313 likes...Marvyn. The crystal revives Aster. Vorta, "I see you...sooner than expected." Aster says he made the Masters sleep..."nothing in their wake but ash." Talon asks why he's called "Betrayer." Aster grew fond of the people and couldn't stand his kin erasing them. "I should've eliminated them;" sleep was a mistake. "We must destroy them." Vorta asks if Aster's "ready to pay for your sins?" Aster is, "at the Skevikor...we will settle our differences." The end begins now.
48	12	"The Betrayer"	Milan Todorović	Justin Partridge	September 30, 2021	0.32
Marvyn pleads, "save them." But Wren and Janzo can't revive even one...kahvi emerge, dying. Aster explains "the [human] lady" Talon saw "showed me the beauty of the first intelligent species" they found, thus he betrayed the Six. The baby was Aster's by Tallya (Yindrian for "Talon"). Blackbloods are Aster's descendants. Aster asks about "ahl-kora blades," which separate "souls...into kinj form," inducing sleep. Talon, "My mother's blade." Aster, it "can only be used once." Choose "the right one." Talon tells Garret, "Yes...I'll marry you." Wren asks Aster to re-suspend the Kahvi, but all Seven must operate the Skevikor altar. His indifference appalls her. Aster disagrees–it's a choice, save your kind or mine–the Six must die. The Six approach. Ordering evacuation, Garret needs time. Janzo suggests a forest fire. Levare battles Garret; Zed's arrow explodes incendiary oil, delaying them. Wren plans they strike after Janya revives kahvis, but before Vorta transfers her gold kinjes. But Aster can't overcome their collective will. Previously, humans helped wielding ahl-kora blades. Vorta is "prepared" for the betrayer. Talon, "We're out of time." Searching the cosmos, Aster finds a frozen world to kill the Six, but "it has to be," Talon who wields "my power."
49	13	"Nothing Lasts Forever"	Milan Todorović	Jason Faller	October 7, 2021	0.32
Aster prepares Talon, revealing a dark, cold void. You'll need to kill me to take my kinj. Talon doesn't want to, but there's "no other way...One life for many." Wren and Talon insist on saving the Kahvi. Marvyn says he cares for "All...my people...my daughter." Aster agrees, but all Seven Masters are required. The six arrive. "Lead us to the Skevikor." Janya revives kahvi. Vorta transfers kinjes. Talon's ahl-kora blade pierces Aster, transferring his kinj. Talon stabs Tera, who Janya tries healing. Talon opens the portal...Garret shoots Janya to prevent resurrection; she's blown backwards into the void. Next, Zed kicks Levare in, "for Nedra." Munt protects Janzo and Wren from revived kahvi. Talon's swing-log booby trap knocks Golu into the void. The Three stand at the Keep. Vorta, "We are forever." Zed and Garret stab-push Kultor into Talon's portal. Luna's throwing dagger hits Tera, saving Talon, who stabs him, kicking the pommel to knock Tera in. Vorta telekinetically raises flagstones. Distracted, Vorta throws them at Luna. Talon throws her sword, hitting Vorta. Talon, "Nothing lasts forever," kicking Vorta in to freeze. Marvyn tells the Kahvi, "The Masters are gone. These are my friends...who set you free." They salute Marvyn. Epilogue : Aster made Talon promise, all Seven be destroyed. Wren conducts the funeral ceremony, bidding "farewell to our first ancestor...to the other shore." Aster's body is launched into the river, where Talon opens a portal to where he may "finally rest in peace." One month later : Humans, blackbloods and kahvis gather. Wren officiates the wedding of Garret and Talon. The people cheer. Zed presents Rosmund's crown. Talon steps forward, allowing Zed to crown her. Garret kneels, followed by the people. "Get up, silly. You're king." Zed announces, "Long live the Queen!" Talon adds, "Long live King Garret!"

== Production and broadcast ==
Syfy International greenlit the series for a 10-episode first season on January 16, 2018. On March 7, 2018, The CW picked up the series for broadcast in the United States. It was filmed in Utah between January and May 2018.

In October 2018, The CW renewed The Outpost for a second season, which premiered on July 11, 2019. Production on the second season began in January 2019, with production on the series moving to Serbia. The CW renewed the series for a third season in October 2019 which premiered on October 8, 2020. In March 2020, Stormoen announced that production of The Outpost had been shut down during the filming of the sixth and seventh episodes of the season due to the COVID-19 pandemic. On June 8, 2020, it was reported production was set to resume filming for the third season in Serbia on June 12, 2020.

On October 7, 2020, ahead of the third-season premiere, The CW picked up an additional 13 episodes of the series. In May 2021, it was reported that The Outpost would return to airing on The CW on July 15, 2021. On September 15, 2021, The CW canceled the series after four seasons, and it concluded on October 7, 2021.

== Home media ==
The first season was released on DVD from Electric Entertainment on August 6, 2019. The second season was released on DVD from Electric Entertainment on September 15, 2020.

== Reception ==
=== Critical response ===
The review aggregation website Rotten Tomatoes reports a score of 50% for the series, with an average rating of 4.67/10, based on 10 reviews. The website's critical consensus reads, "A featherweight fantasy with a few enticing features, The Outpost's potential pleasures can't quite overcome its cheap-looking production design." On Metacritic, the series holds a score of 39 out of 100, based on 5 critics, indicating "generally unfavorable reviews".

In his review of the premiere, Daniel Fienberg of The Hollywood Reporter considered the series looked "cheap" for a broadcast network series, adding that, "Way too much of the pilot for The Outpost is people talking around the things the budget can't show." CBR's Josh Bell similarly criticized the series' production values, but also its use of fantasy "clichés and contrivances" in the pilot episode. Several critics compared The Outpost unfavorably to other fantasy series, including Game of Thrones, Lord of the Rings, and Xena: Warrior Princess.

=== Ratings ===
Viewership and ratings per season of The Outpost
Season	Timeslot (ET)	Episodes	First aired		Last aired		TV season	Viewership rank	Avg. viewers (millions)
Season	Timeslot (ET)	Episodes	Date	Viewers (millions)	Date	Viewers (millions)	TV season	Viewership rank	Avg. viewers (millions)
1	Tuesday 9:00 p.m.	10	July 10, 2018	0.77	October 2, 2018	0.59	2017–18	N/A	0.63
2	Thursday 8:00 p.m.	13	July 11, 2019	0.61	September 26, 2019	0.48	2018–19	204	0.89
3	Thursday 9:00 p.m. (1–6); Sunday 9:00 p.m. (7–13)	13	October 8, 2020	0.46	January 3, 2021	0.29	2020–21	TBD	TBD
4	Thursday 9:00 p.m.	13	July 15, 2021	0.45	October 7, 2021	0.32	2020–21	TBD	TBD

==== Season 1 ====
Viewership and ratings per episode of The Outpost
No.	Title	Air date	Rating/share (18–49)	Viewers (millions)	DVR (18–49)	DVR viewers (millions)	Total (18–49)	Total viewers (millions)
1	"One Is the Loneliest Number"	July 10, 2018	0.1/1	0.77	0.1	0.32	0.2	1.09
2	"Two Heads Are Better Than None"	July 17, 2018	0.2/1	0.64	—N/a	0.40	—N/a	1.03
3	"The Mistress and the Worm"	July 24, 2018	0.1/1	0.64	0.1	0.35	0.2	0.99
4	"Strange Bedfellows"	July 31, 2018	0.1/1	0.61	0.1	0.30	0.2	0.90
5	"Bones to Pick"	August 7, 2018	0.1/1	0.60	0.1	0.36	0.2	0.96
6	"The Book of Names"	August 21, 2018	0.1/1	0.56	0.1	0.30	0.2	0.86
7	"The Colipsum Conundrum"	August 28, 2018	0.2/1	0.64	—N/a	0.28	—N/a	0.92
8	"Beyond the Wall"	September 11, 2018	0.2/1	0.65	—N/a	0.30	—N/a	0.95
9	"The Vex Rezicon"	September 25, 2018	0.2/1	0.60	—N/a	0.33	—N/a	0.93
10	"The Dragman is Coming"	October 2, 2018	0.1/1	0.59	—N/a	0.26	—N/a	0.85

==== Season 2 ====
Viewership and ratings per episode of The Outpost
No.	Title	Air date	Rating/share (18–49)	Viewers (millions)	DVR (18–49)	DVR viewers (millions)	Total (18–49)	Total viewers (millions)
1	"We Only Kill to Survive"	July 11, 2019	0.1/1	0.61	0.1	0.27	0.2	0.88
2	"This Is One Strange Town"	July 18, 2019	0.1/1	0.54	0.1	0.29	0.2	0.83
3	"Not In This Kingdom"	July 25, 2019	0.1/1	0.52	—N/a	0.22	—N/a	0.74
4	"Regarding the Matter of Garret Spears"	August 1, 2019	0.2/1	0.65	0.0	0.20	0.2	0.85
5	"The Blade of The Three"	August 8, 2019	0.1/1	0.63	0.1	0.24	0.2	0.87
6	"Because She's Worth It"	August 15, 2019	0.1/1	0.60	0.1	0.25	0.2	0.85
7	"Where You Go, People Die"	August 22, 2019	0.1/1	0.65	0.1	0.23	0.2	0.88
8	"A Crown For The Queen"	August 29, 2019	0.1/1	0.48	0.1	0.24	0.2	0.82
9	"There Will Be a Reckoning"	September 5, 2019	0.1/1	0.64	0.1	0.20	0.2	0.84
10	"The Only Way"	September 12, 2019	0.1/1	0.63	0.1	0.24	0.2	0.88
11	"Nothing Short of Heroic"	September 19, 2019	0.1/1	0.66	0.1	0.23	0.2	0.89
12	"In The Worst Corner of My Memory"	September 26, 2019	0.1/1	0.59	—N/a	0.28	—N/a	0.87
13	"This Is Our Outpost"	September 26, 2019	0.1/1	0.48	—N/a	0.28	—N/a	0.76

==== Season 3 ====
Viewership and ratings per episode of The Outpost
No.	Title	Air date	Rating (18–49)	Viewers (millions)	DVR (18–49)	DVR viewers (millions)	Total (18–49)	Total viewers (millions)
1	"For the Sins of Your Ancestors"	October 8, 2020	0.1	0.46	—N/a	—N/a	—N/a	—N/a
2	"The Peace You Promised"	October 15, 2020	0.1	0.59	—N/a	—N/a	—N/a	—N/a
3	"A Life for a Life"	October 22, 2020	0.1	0.43	—N/a	—N/a	—N/a	—N/a
4	"The Key to Paradise"	October 29, 2020	0.1	0.44	0.0	0.16	0.1	0.60
5	"Under Yavalla's Control"	November 5, 2020	0.1	0.44	0.0	0.21	0.1	0.65
6	"Kill the Rat, Kill the Kinj"	November 12, 2020	0.1	0.42	0.0	0.23	0.1	0.65
7	"Go Ahead and Run"	November 22, 2020	0.1	0.38	TBD	TBD	TBD	TBD
8	"Dying Is Painful"	November 29, 2020	0.0	0.25	TBD	TBD	TBD	TBD
9	"She Is Not A God"	December 6, 2020	0.1	0.34	TBD	TBD	TBD	TBD
10	"From Paradise to Hell and Back"	December 13, 2020	0.0	0.26	TBD	TBD	TBD	TBD
11	"The Hardest Part of Being Queen"	December 20, 2020	0.1	0.32	TBD	TBD	TBD	TBD
12	"Where Death Lives"	December 27, 2020	0.0	0.31	TBD	TBD	TBD	TBD
13	"Violence Is Futile"	January 3, 2021	0.1	0.29	TBD	TBD	TBD	TBD

==== Season 4 ====
Viewership and ratings per episode of The Outpost
No.	Title	Air date	Rating (18–49)	Viewers (millions)	DVR (18–49)	DVR viewers (millions)	Total (18–49)	Total viewers (millions)
1	"Someone Has to Rule"	July 15, 2021	0.0	0.45	0.0	0.22	0.0	0.67
2	"A Throne of Our Own"	July 22, 2021	0.1	0.45	0.0	0.18	0.1	0.62
3	"The Gods Thank You"	July 29, 2021	0.0	0.45	0.0	0.16	0.0	0.60
4	"Going to Meet the Gods"	August 5, 2021	0.0	0.33	0.0	0.16	0.1	0.49
5	"They Bleed Black Blood"	August 12, 2021	0.1	0.49	0.0	0.18	0.1	0.67
6	"All We Do Is Say Goodbye"	August 19, 2021	0.1	0.46	0.0	0.19	0.1	0.65
7	"The Power of the Masters"	August 26, 2021	0.1	0.46	TBD	TBD	TBD	TBD
8	"The Pleasing Voice of the Masters"	September 2, 2021	0.0	0.39	TBD	TBD	TBD	TBD
9	"The Price of Immortality"	September 9, 2021	0.0	0.33	TBD	TBD	TBD	TBD
10	"Something to Live For"	September 16, 2021	0.1	0.37	TBD	TBD	TBD	TBD
11	"Guardian of the Asterkinj"	September 23, 2021	0.1	0.35	TBD	TBD	TBD	TBD
12	"The Betrayer"	September 30, 2021	0.0	0.32	TBD	TBD	TBD	TBD
13	"Nothing Lasts Forever"	October 7, 2021	0.0	0.32	TBD	TBD	TBD	TBD

=== Awards and nominations ===
Year	Association	Category	Nominee(s)	Result	Ref.
2019	Saturn Awards	Best Fantasy Television Series	The Outpost	Nominated	
2020	Saturn Awards	Best Action-Thriller Television Series	The Outpost	Nominated	
