= Jake Stormoen =

American actor

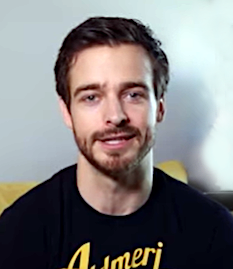
- Jake Stormoen in 2018
- Born: Minneapolis, Minnesota, U.S.
- Occupation: Actor
- Years active: 2008–present
- Relatives: Kenyon Laing (cousin)

Jake Stormoen is an American actor known for his role as Dagen in the Mythica film series and as Captain Garret Spears in the fantasy-adventure drama television series The Outpost.

== Early life and career ==
Jacob Leif Stormoen was born in Minneapolis, Minnesota, US. to parents of Norwegian descent. Stormoen grew up in Minneapolis along with his younger sister Anna Stormoen. After graduating from high school in the U.S., he enrolled at the University of Southern Queensland in Toowoomba, Queensland, Australia, where he obtained a Bsc Arts in Creative Media. After being a waiter for 6 months, he returned to the United States, to Los Angeles, California to pursue a career in acting. Stormoen is friends with Kristian Nairn, the actor who plays Hodor in Game of Thrones, the friendship developed online whilst in High school, playing World of Warcraft (WoW). Stormoen later co-starred with Nairn in the Kurt Knight horror thriller film The Appearance in 2018. In 2015, Stormoen won the 'Best Supporting Actor' award at the Utah Film Festival for his performance as Airk in the fantasy film The Christmas Dragon. Apart from acting, he has also worked as a writer and associate producer in a couple of short films.

In 2014, Stormoen landed his first “major” role as Dagen in the Arrowstorm fantasy-adventure drama film Mythica: A Quest for Heroes, a franchise where he starred in 4 more films, Mythica: The Necromancer and Mythica: The Darkspore in 2015, then Mythica: The Godslayer and Mythica: The Iron Crown in 2016. Stormoen's inherent love for and being a life-long fan of fantasy and science fiction, is the main reason why he enjoys working for the Utah-based production company, Arrowstorm Entertainment, because they specialise in that genre.

In 2018, Stormoen continued his success with Arrowstorm Entertainment in a lead role as Captain Garret Spears in The CW's fantasy-adventure drama television series The Outpost, alongside Jessica Green and Anand Desai-Barochia. The CW announced that series 3 of The Outpost will be extended by a further 13 episodes in 2020. In 2023, he directed Mythica: Stormbound, the sixth film in the Mythica (film series).

== Filmography ==
=== Film ===
Year	Title	Role
2008	Step Up 2: The Streets	Dan
2012	Mood (Short)	Michael
2013	Compossibility Theory (Short)	Stan
2014	Mythica: A Quest for Heroes	Dagen
2014	Mochila: A Pony Express Adventure (Short)	Sheriff
2015	Mythica: The Necromancer	Dagen
2015	Miracle Maker	Thomas Keating
2015	Mythica: The Darkspore	Dagen
2015	War Pigs	Frenchy
2015	Be My Frankenstein (Short)	Charles
2016	Mythica: The Godslayer	Dagen
2016	Kiss the Devil in the Dark (Short)	Edgar
2016	Grace Note (Short)	Dominic
2016	Triple Wong Dare You (Short)	Hot Tod
2016	Nocturne	Gabe
2016	Mythica: The Iron Crown	Dagen
2016	Cyborg X	Lieutenant Wizkowski (Wiz)
2018	The Appearance	Mateho
2019	Phoenix Blue (Short)	Jason
2020	Bookworm and the Beast	Grant Beiste
2020	Her Deadly Reflections	Logan
2022	Quest For Love	Ethan/Shane
2024	Mythica: Stormbound	Director
2026	Sleeping Beauty Next Door	Taylor

=== Television ===
Year	Title	Role	Notes
2012	Lucky Days (TV series)	Alfred	1 episode - Pizza, Pizza!
2012	My Gimpy Life (TV series)	Waiter #1	1 episode - Crowded
2013	Zombie Break Room (TV series)	Joey	1 episode
2014	The Christmas Dragon	Airk	TV film
2015	Pen & Paper & Laser Guns (TV series)	Zac	Episodes #1.1 and #1.2
2017	Relationship Status (TV series)	Marcus	1 episode - Mate
2017	Extinct	Duncan	9 episodes
2018	Christmas Wonderland	Matt Sampson	TV movie
2018	Devil's Got My Back	Recorder	TV movie
2018–2021	The Outpost	Captain Garret Spears	36 episodes
2021	Love, Lost & Found	Joey Bufalino	TV movie
2026	Seeking Persephone	Adam	TV Mini series

=== Video games ===
Year	Title	Role
2021	The Elder Scrolls Online	Destron Brolus, the Adoring Admirer

== Video ==
Year	Title	Role
2006	Deadbolt (Video short)	Ethan Banks
2007	Absolute (Video)	Brandon Woods
2017	Carthage (Video)	Dan Jones

== Awards and nominations ==
Year	Award	Category	Nominated work	Result	Ref.
2015	Utah Film Awards	Best Supporting Actor	The Christmas Dragon	Won	
