= Pride & Prejudice: A Latter-Day Comedy =

Pride and Prejudice
- Directed by: Andrew Black
- Screenplay by: Anne Black; Jason Faller; Katherine Swigert
- Based on: Pride and Prejudice; 1813 novel by Jane Austen
- Produced by: Jason Faller; Kynan Griffin
- Starring: Kam Heskin; Orlando Seale; Ben Gourley; Lucila Solá; Henry Maguire; Carmen Rasmusen
- Cinematography: Bianca Cline
- Edited by: Alexander Vance
- Music by: Ben Carson
- Distributed by: Excel Entertainment Group
- Release date: 2003
- Running time: 104 min.
- Language: English
- Budget: $350,000
- Box office: $377,271

Pride & Prejudice: A Latter-Day Comedy is a 2003 independent romantic comedy film directed by Andrew Black and produced by Jason Faller. The screenplay, by Anne Black, Jason Faller, and Katherine Swigert, is an adaptation of Jane Austen's 1813 novel Pride and Prejudice set in modern-day Provo, Utah. The film stars Kam Heskin as college student Elizabeth Bennet whose dreams of becoming an author supersede the cultural and societal pressures to be married. Elizabeth tries to escape the advances of several bachelors, including handsome but haughty businessman Will Darcy.

Audience reception was mixed, with some critics praising the screenplay and the performances and others calling it a poor adaptation of the novel.

== Plot ==
Elizabeth Bennet is a twenty-six-year-old college student living in early-2000s Utah. She lives at 318 Longbourne Avenue (Note: In the novel, the Bennet estate is Longbourn.) with four roommates Jane, Mary, and Meryton sisters Lydia and Kitty. (Note: In the novel, Meryton is the nearest town to the Bennet estate at Longbourn.) Despite the social pressure to be married, Bennet is not interested in dating men until after she graduates and rather focuses her attention on becoming a writer. While working her shift at a bookstore, she meets pompous Englishman Will Darcy, who criticizes Bennet for her arrogant attitude. After work, Jane convinces Elizabeth to attend a party thrown by the wealthy Charles Bingley with her roommates. Jane meets Bingley, and they immediately become smitten with each other. While avoiding her admirer, Collins, Elizabeth runs into her romantic interest, Jack, who casually proposes marriage to her over a game of pool. Elizabeth rejects him because she wants to focus on graduating and becoming a writer. Meanwhile, Bingley's sister Caroline pursues Darcy, and Darcy orders Jack to leave the party. Jack tells Elizabeth they have a history of animosity due to disagreements about a girl.

The next day, Jane and Elizabeth run into Darcy and Bingley playing tennis and join them. Caroline flirts with Darcy, but Darcy says he is interested in Elizabeth. Bingley tries to set Elizabeth up for a tennis lesson with Darcy, but she politely refuses and leaves. At home, Jane shows Elizabeth a letter from a publisher who wants to meet with Elizabeth. Collins proposes marriage to Elizabeth despite her clear uninterest and blatant refusal. Later, Jack takes Elizabeth on a date where Elizabeth curbs Jack's conversations about marriage. Jack reveals that in the past, Darcy bribed him to stop dating his sister, Anna. Elizabeth rejects Jack's unsolicited kiss which ends their date. Darcy visits Elizabeth at the bookstore, calls her "strangely attractive", and invites her to dinner. Elizabeth turns him down, offended by the rude manner in which he tried to compliment her. Back at home, Jane reveals to Elizabeth, crying, that Bingley has left Utah. Laughing, Jane tells Elizabeth that Collins proposed to her after class.

Elizabeth arrives at a restaurant called Rosings (Note: In the book, Rosings Park is the home of Darcy's aunt, Lady Catherine de Bourgh, and also close to the place where Elizabeth turns down Darcy's first proposal.) to meet with D&G Publishers to learn that not only is Darcy conducting her meeting, but he is the co-owner of the company. Darcy offers to publish the novel if it is extensively edited. Before storming out of the restaurant, Elizabeth blames Darcy for ruining Jack's relationship with Anna as well as Jane and Bingley's relationship. Darcy sends Elizabeth an email, apologizing for his bluntness and revealing that Jack had eloped to Las Vegas with Anna and maxed out her credit cards to pay off his gambling debts. Darcy paid off the debt and Anna filed for divorce, but it turned out Jack was still legally married to another girl. Darcy further explains that Bingley left on his own accord after seeing Collins propose to Jane. After spending time sad and heart-broken, Elizabeth begins editing her novel and prepares to go on a London study abroad as a replacement teaching assistant for her professor. In the mountains, Jane runs into Bingley and they quickly reconcile. Left alone, Elizabeth falls asleep editing her novel and wakes up to a thunderstorm. Unable to find her car, she enters a cabin that belongs to Darcy and Anna. They invite her to dinner before she can leave unnoticed. Darcy tells Elizabeth that he is leaving for California the next day but invites her to dinner when he comes back. Elizabeth tells him that she is leaving for London soon. Caroline interrupts their conversation. Caroline gives Elizabeth a ride to her car and tells her that she will miss her and Darcy's wedding while she is in London.

Back at home, Kitty reveals Lydia and Jack have secretly traveled to Las Vegas to elope. Elizabeth, Jane, Bingley, and Kitty rush to stop them. After receiving a call from Bingley, Darcy stops the ceremony at a Scottish-themed chapel. (Note: In the novel, Lydia and Wickham must go to Scotland to marry because they can do so more quickly than they could in England (see Gretna Green Marriage).) After a physical altercation, Jack is arrested for gambling and bigamy. Believing Darcy is marrying Caroline, Elizabeth leaves with her roommates and Darcy runs after her. Elizabeth and Darcy kiss in the middle of the road. The characters are shown in sequence in the future. Lydia never marries and authors a self-help book. Kitty becomes a professional cheerleader and later, a high school cheerleading coach; she marries and has five daughters. Collins and Mary marry. Caroline marries a 75-year-old billionaire with a heart condition, who lives for another eighteen years and with whom she has three children. Jane and Bingley marry and his wealth allows them to retire in South America. Jack escapes from prison and lives in Brazil while pursuing a career in daytime television. Elizabeth goes to London and finishes her novel. Darcy visits her in London and proposes to her, and she accepts.

== Cast ==
- Kam Heskin as Elizabeth Bennet (Elizabeth Bennet)
- Orlando Seale as Will Darcy (Fitzwilliam Darcy)
- Carmen Rasmusen as Charlotte Lucas (Charlotte Lucas)
- Ben Gourley as Charles Bingley (Charles Bingley)
- Lucila Sola as Jane Vasquez (Jane Bennet)
- Rainy Kerwin as Mary Lamblen (Mary Bennet)
- Kelly Stables as Lydia Meryton (Lydia Bennet)
- Amber Hamilton as Kitty Meryton, credited as Nicole Hamilton (Catherine Bennet)
- Henry Maguire as Jack Wickam (George Wickham)
- Kara Holden as Caroline Bingley (Caroline Bingley)
- Hubbel Palmer as William Collins (William Collins)
- Honor Bliss as Anna Darcy (Georgiana Darcy)

== Production ==
Director Andrew Black and his colleagues developed the idea for Pride & Prejudice while studying at Brigham Young University (BYU). After graduating, Black decided to stay in Utah to produce a film. Black's short film The Snell Show, having won Best Short award at the Slamdance Film Festival, aided Black in obtaining investors for his first feature-length film project. Producer Jason Faller decided that the novel Pride and Prejudice would be good source material for a film based in Provo, Utah, due to similarities between the Regency era and Latter-day Saint culture: expectations to marry young and the emphasis on pre-marital chastity. However, Black and Faller sought to "make a film that [would] appeal to both insiders and outsiders", with LDS culture serving as "just a backdrop". Thus, direct references to the Church of Jesus Christ of Latter-day Saints or BYU were omitted, and the subtitle A Latter-day Comedy did not appear on the DVD cover.

The cast was obtained largely from Los Angeles and included members of the Church of Jesus Christ of Latter-day Saints (LDS Church). The cast participated in LDS culture in Utah to better prepare for the project. To specifically prepare, Seale read Jane Austen's novel but did not watch previous film adaptations to avoid being intimidated by previous actors' performances. Heskin also avoided viewing previous versions. The film was shot in Utah over a five-week period.

== Release and reception ==
Distributed by LDS company Excel Entertainment Group, the film was released in select Utah theaters on December 5, 2003. At the time of release, The Pink Bible: How to Bring Your Man to His Knees, the book featured in the film, was available for purchase. The film was released on DVD in November 2004. Excel tried to appeal to non-LDS audiences by removing the subtitle and some of the culturally and religiously specific dialogue. However, the film was not widely received.

The film received mixed reviews. Richard Corliss of Time Magazine called the screenplay "clever" and the acting "fresh". Variety praised the film's pacing and timing, as well as its production design and the cast's charismatic performances. Despite being an LDS movie, most critics agreed that the LDS content was subtle and may not be noticed by non-LDS audiences. However, Deborah Cartmell called it a "poor quality adaptation" of Pride & Prejudice and "unworthy of critical commentary", citing the poor acting and low-budget production value. Moveover, the Los Angeles Times gave the film a scathing review, calling the film too forced and predictable.

The review aggregator website Rotten Tomatoes reported that 66% of critics have given the film a positive review based on 29 reviews, with an average rating of 6.57/10.
