= Mythica (film series) =

2014–2024 fantasy film series by Anne K. Black

Mythica: A Quest for Heroes
- Directed by: Anne K. Black
- Written by: Anne K. Black, Jason Faller, and Kynan Griffin
- Produced by: Jason Faller and Kynan Griffin
- Starring: Melanie Stone; Adam Johnson; Jake Stormoen; Nicola Posener; Christopher Robin Miller; Kevin Sorbo; Natalie Devine; Robert Jayne; Michael Flynn
- Cinematography: A. Todd Smith
- Edited by: Rob York
- Music by: Nathaniel Drew
- Production company: Arrowstorm Entertainment
- Language: English

Mythica is a series of primarily direct-to-video fantasy films. The films are produced by Arrowstorm Entertainment, with first film Mythica: A Quest for Heroes being partly funded by a Kickstarter campaign that collected $94,294. There are six films in the Mythica series, all produced and co-written by Jason Faller and Kynan Griffin. The films star Melanie Stone as Marek, an escaped slave girl and budding magician, and co-star Kevin Sorbo as Gojun Pye the magician who trains her, along with Adam Johnson, Jake Stormoen, and Nicola Posener as those that team up with Marek on various quests together.

== Film series ==
Film	Release date	Director(s)	Screenwriter(s)	Producer(s)
Mythica: A Quest for Heroes	December 8, 2014	Anne K. Black	Anne K. Black, Jason Faller, and Kynan Griffin	Jason Faller and Kynan Griffin
Mythica: The Darkspore	June 19, 2015	Anne K. Black	Anne K. Black, Jason Faller, and Kynan Griffin	Jason Faller and Kynan Griffin
Mythica: The Necromancer	December 19, 2015	A. Todd Smith	Jason Faller, Justin Partridge, and Liska Ostojic	Jennifer Griffin and Andrew Mecham
Mythica: The Iron Crown	May 14, 2016	John Lyde	Jason Faller	Jennifer Griffin
Mythica: The Godslayer	December 17, 2016	John Lyde	Jason Faller and Kynan Griffin	Jennifer Griffin
Mythica: Stormbound	January 31, 2024	Jake Stormoen	Justin Partridge	Larissa Beck, Jennifer Griffin, and Justin Partridge

== Cast and characters ==
List indicators

This section includes characters who have appeared in a film in the series.

- An empty grey cell indicates the character was not in the film.
- ^{V} indicates a voice-only role.

Character
Character	Film					
Character	A Quest for Heroes	The Darkspore	The Necromancer	The Iron Crown	The Godslayer	Stormbound
Character	2014	2015		2016		2024
Introduced in A Quest for Heroes
Thane	Adam Johnson	Adam Johnson	Adam Johnson	Adam Johnson	Adam Johnson	Adam Johnson
Teela	Nicola Posener	Nicola Posener	Nicola Posener	Nicola Posener	Nicola Posener	Nicola Posener
Marek	Melanie Stone	Melanie Stone	Melanie Stone	Melanie Stone	Melanie Stone	
Dagen	Jake Stormoen	Jake Stormoen	Jake Stormoen	Jake Stormoen	Jake Stormoen	
Hammerhead	Christopher Robin Miller	Christopher Robin Miller	Christopher Robin Miller	Christopher Robin Miller	Christopher Robin Miller	
Gojun Pye	Kevin Sorbo	Kevin Sorbo	Kevin Sorbo	Kevin Sorbo	Kevin Sorbo	
Peregus Malister	Robert Jayne	Robert Jayne	Robert Jayne			
Rawhead	James Christian Morris	James Christian Morris	James Christian Morris			
Caeryn	Natalie Devine Riskas	Natalie Devine Riskas				
Vagamal	Michael Flynn	Michael Flynn				
Magistrate	Nyk Fry	Nyk Fry				
Kishkumen	Ryan Palmer	Ryan Palmer				
Tersa	Clare Niederpruem	Clare Niederpruem				
Ana-Sett	Lauren Spalding			Nicola Posener	Lauren Spalding	
Egan "The Stranger"	Sebastian Barr					Will Kemp
Mekru Nom	Kee Chan					
Narne	Angella Joy					
Introduced in The Darkspore
Szorlok		Matthew Mercer	Matthew Mercer	Matthew Mercer	Matthew Mercer	Matthew Mercer
Qole		Rocky Myers				
Althalos		Brogan Johnson				
Embarr		Larissa Beck				
Introduced in The Necromancer
Betylla			Philip Brodie			
The Eel			Davey Morrison			
Captain Purio			Geoff Hansen			
Yuliya			Evie Brodie			
Introduced in The Iron Crown
Thorsten				James Gaisford		
Caia-Bekk				Ash Santos		
Rezzik				Jasen Wade		
Sergeant Lipschitz				Maclain Nelson		
The Guardian				Chris Rueckert		
Admiral Borlund Hess				Eve Mauro		
Introduced in The Godslayer
General Argus					Clint Vanderlinden	
General Roghar					James Martin Trenton James^{V}	
Tek					Kristian Nairn	
Introduced in Stormbound
Arlin						Ryann Bailey
Leyaris						Dave Martinez
Rhistel Kriswood						Paul Cartwright
Erid						Nate Morley
Giblock						Joe Abraham
Aymon Thadruck						Tod Huntington
Mahitable Crow						Barta Heiner
Resma						Tatum Langton

== Production ==
The film was partly funded by a Kickstarter campaign that collected $94,294, and which described the proposed film as an "epic fantasy". It was produced by Jason Faller and Kynan Griffin for Arrowstorm Entertainment, directed by Anne K. Black, and written by Black, Faller and Griffin.

Mythica was filmed in Utah, where producers/writers Faller and Griffin are from, and where Arrowstorm Entertainment is based. The films received a tax credit of up to $278,000 in 2015 for filming in Utah from the Governor's Office of Economic Development Board.

Kevin Sorbo, who plays one of the roles in the film, said about the project: "Mythica"— a movie like "The Lord of the Rings", where I play someone like Gandalf...

== A Quest for Heroes ==
Mythica: A Quest for Heroes is a 2014 Arrowstorm Entertainment fantasy film written and directed by Anne K. Black and starring Melanie Stone and Kevin Sorbo. The movie is the first of a six-part film series, and was partly funded by a Kickstarter campaign that collected $94,294.

=== Plot ===
Marek, a young aspiring magician and slave girl, dreams of escaping her drab life and taking on exciting adventures, while being taught by sorcerer Gojun Pye. When she meets the priestess Teela in Hammerhead's tavern who is seeking help, Marek offers her assistance, running away from her owner. While beginning to use her magic abilities and using a brace to help her with her injured leg, Marek assembles a motley troupe, consisting of herself; Teela; Thane, who is a former soldier/warrior and who rescued Marek from a harassing Peregus Malister; and Dagen, who is a half-elf, thief, and womanizer. Together, they go in search of Teela's sister, who is in possession of a mysterious stone that was taken from a temple of Teela's people, and who was kidnapped by a wild ogre and a few orcs who want the stone for their necromancer master, Sung Hill.

== The Darkspore ==
Mythica: The Darkspore

Mythica: The Darkspore is a 2015 Arrowstorm Entertainment fantasy film, the second installment in the Mythica series.It is directed by Anne K. Black and co-written by Jason Faller and Kynan Griffin, starring Kevin Sorbo and Melanie Stone.

=== Plot ===
Following immediately from the end of the A Quest for Heroes, Teela's sister is killed by Kishkumen, a dark magician with yellow eyes, who also steals the mysterious stone that she was carrying, and wants to give it to his master Szorlok.

Meanwhile, sorcerer Gojun Pye tells Marek about the stone: a fragment/shard of the full Darkspore, a piece that can give the user a great immense power, which once belonged to the Lich King, and that was found by Szorlok and his followers years ago, split into fragments, but after using his followers to reunite the Darkspore he was stopped by Gojun Pye and other sorcerers from getting the power from the piece, and in the aftermath, the sorcerers split the piece into four fragments/shards and hid them apart in the world (one was with Teela's sister and her people, a second was hidden in a dragon's lair in an ancient ruined city).

Gojun Pye also tells Marek about who she is: a necromancer, just like Szorlok, and that is why Szorlok also wants Marek at his side, because the potential power she holds within. That power is also what Teela sensed in the previous film, while trying to heal Marek's leg, and it's also what might drive Marek to the darkness if she is not careful when using it.

Marek and her company must go on a journey to the ruined city, and prevent the evil necromancer Szorlok from obtaining all the shards of the Darkspore, or all will be lost. Therefore, they must get the hidden shard from the ruined city before Kishkumen does. Along the way they meet Qole, a mysterious dark-elf warrior with his face marked with strange drawings that allows him to be unharmed by dark magic, who allies himself with Marek after she saves him from faeries, and they are also pursued by Peregus Malister and his forces, who wants revenge from events of the previous film.

== The Necromancer ==
Mythica: The Necromancer

Mythica: The Necromancer is the third installment of Mythica, directed by A. Todd Smith and written by Jason Faller, Liska Ostojic, and Justin Partridge. It stars Kevin Sorbo and Melanie Stone.

=== Plot ===
Marek is beginning to master more advanced magic, by training with Gojun Pye and receiving a staff from him, and even helping him stop some orcs who had set a trap for him, although he reminds her that she needs to be careful about her necromancer powers which can lead her to darkness, because by taking life force from someone it would be hard for her to come back from it. He details a bit more of the past (which he began telling Marek in the previous film) and about his former team of sorcerers and their enemy Szorlok: they were called The Red Thorns, they were powerful and invincible, the envy of the realm, and Szorlok wanted to stop the invading vitalian soldiers, by becoming the Lich King and thus rising and controlling hordes of undead. By defeating Szorlok, one of the sorcerers sacrificed himself, and that led to the disband of the group, and also to the accomplished invasion by the vitalian soldiers as a side-effect. For the ritual to become the Lich King, after gathering the four pieces of the Darkspore, Szorlok will need other necromancers, and that includes Marek, so she must lay low as to not be found by Szorlok. Gojun Pye reminds Marek that Szorlok already has two pieces of the Darkspore.

Meanwhile, Marek and her group have become respected in Hammerhead's tavern, they adopt the name of Red Thorns, and Thane becomes more involved with Teela. When he is taken hostage by Peregus Malister, the cruel master of the Thieves Guild who is seeking revenge for having been forced to sign for the freedom of Marek, she must embark on a corrupt mission to serve the Thieves Guild with her team of would-be heroes, by retrieving some ilystrium from The Eel (his name later revealed to be Kelton) whose whereabouts are known to a Captain named Purio, while in the midst of creatures called gooches, and also several golgotians, as well as cave demons.

== The Iron Crown ==
The fourth film in the Mythica series. Directed by John Lyde and written by Jason Faller and Kynan Griffin.

When daring young witch Marek steals the final piece of the all-powerful Darkspore she embarks on a desperate quest to deliver the cursed artefact to the gods. But is caught in a death race between a ruthless team of elite mercenaries and a trinity of demons.

== The Godslayer ==
Mythica: The Godslayer (titled Mythica: The Dragon Slayer in the United Kingdom) is the fifth installment of Mythica, directed by John Lyde and written by Jason Faller, Kynan Griffin, starring Kevin Sorbo and Melanie Stone.

As the Lich King's zombie legions ravage the world, Marek and Dagen embark on a quest to obtain a weapon from the gods.

== Stormbound ==
Mythica: Stormbound is the sixth installment, which was successfully funded on Kickstarter on December 9, 2022, with Jake Stormoen returning to direct the film. Confirmed returning cast include Matthew Mercer, Nicola Posener, and Adam Johnson. The story is set to take place some time after the events of the fifth film and will introduce new heroes and villains.

== Reception ==
SciFiPulse.Net called Mythica: A Quest for Heroes "a solid opening chapter" and said that although the show was not particularly original it was "an unabashed celebration of role-playing tropes" and that "Despite the engaging storyline and confident acting some of the CGI [...] was ropey to say the least." Eyeforfilm.co.uk gave it 2.5 out of 5 and called it "a flawed but enjoyable film."
