= The Christmas Dragon =

2014 film directed by John Lyde

- Directed by: John Lyde
- Screenplay by: Shylah Addante; David Addante
- Story by: John Lyde
- Produced by: Jennifer Griffin; John Lyde
- Starring: Bailee Johnson; Jake Stormoen
- Cinematography: John Lyde
- Edited by: John Lyde
- Music by: James Schafer
- Production companies: Arrowstorm Entertainment; Mainstay Productions
- Distributed by: Excel Entertainment
- Release date: November 7, 2014
- Running time: 106 minutes
- Country: United States
- Language: English

The Christmas Dragon is a 2014 American family film directed by John Lyde.

== Plot ==
Ayden, an orphan in Medieval Europe who lost her parents to a dragon, receives a magic crystal from a dying elf to bring back Christmas from becoming a fading memory. She and the other orphans alongside wayward adult Airk must go to the North to meet Father Christmas.

== Cast ==
- Bailee Johnson as Ayden
- Jake Stormoen as Airk
- Paris Warner as Rosalynne
- Jacob Buster as Rand
- Ruby Jones as Hoyt
- Melanie Stone as Saerwen
- Talon Ackerman as Garrett
- Adam Johnson as Father Christmas / Roki
- Renny Grames as Gazared
- Danny James as Bomtall
- Eve Mauro as Aesa

== Reception ==
Common Sense Media gave the film one star.

Stormoen won the Best Supporting Actor category at the Utah Film Awards the next year.

== Legacy ==
It was featured as the final episode of the 13th season of the cult science fiction series Mystery Science Theater 3000.
