= Cavemen (film) =

- Theatrical release poster
- Directed by: Herschel Faber
- Written by: Herschel Faber
- Produced by: Herschel Faber
- Starring: Skylar Astin; Camilla Belle; Chad Michael Murray; Dayo Okeniyi; Alexis Knapp; Kenny Wormald
- Cinematography: Nic Sadler
- Edited by: Robert Schafer
- Music by: Ronen Landa
- Release dates: October 26, 2013 (Austin Film Festival); February 7, 2014 (United States)
- Running time: 88 minutes
- Country: United States
- Language: English
- Budget: $250,000
- Box office: $4 million

Cavemen is a 2013 American comedy film about a young man in Los Angeles who feels the emptiness of a life of dissipation and seeks a genuine relationship, which he discovers is more difficult to do than he thought.

Cavemen made its world premiere at the 2013 Austin Film Festival where the screenplay had been a competition finalist several years earlier. On review aggregation website Rotten Tomatoes, the film holds an approval rating of 14% based on 14 reviews, with an average rating of 3.32/10.

== Cast ==
- Skylar Astin as Dean
- Camilla Belle as Tess
- Chad Michael Murray as Jay
- Dayo Okeniyi as Andre
- Alexis Knapp as Kat
- Kenny Wormald as Pete
- Jason Patric as Jack Bartlett
- Fernanda Romero as Rosa
- Zuleyka Silver as Alicia
- Anand Desai-Barochia as Giuseppe
