= Philip Brodie (actor) =

British actor and writer

- Born: Philip Brodie; 3 April 1975 (age 51); Redhill, Surrey, England
- Occupations: Actor; writer
- Years active: 2002–present
- Spouse: Evie Brodie (m. 2011)

Philip Brodie (born 3 April 1975) is a British actor and writer, best known for his role of Vivian "Jaws" Wright on Dream Team (2004–2005).

== Career ==
His career began in theatre. He then progressed to stand-up in London and Edinburgh and had a stint in the West End.

In 2004, he was cast as Vivian "Jaws" Wright in the Sky One TV series Dream Team. His character was shown to battle OCD, undergo a volatile relationship with his wife and football career and serious mental health issues. In July 2008, he was ranked fifteenth on Sky One's "50 Greatest Hard Men" list.

Brodie's one-man show, Tailor Made Love earned him critical acclaim. The actor has appeared in such films as World of the Dead: The Zombie Diaries (2011) in which he played the lead role, A Landscape of Lies (2011), Mythica: The Necromancer (2015) and starred in Unlocked (2017) alongside Michael Douglas, Toni Collette, Noomi Rapace, John Malkovich and Orlando Bloom. He also starred as Colin Kay in Broken News (2005) and George M. Hendee in Harley and the Davidsons (2016). His stage work includes Midnight's Pumpkin (Kneehigh Theatre), Wah Wah Girls (Sadler's Wells Theatre/Theatre Royal Stratford East), Horse Piss for Blood (Plymouth Theatre Royal) and Decade (Theatre 503).

== Filmography ==
Film
Year	Title	Role	Notes
2002	Shoreditch Twat	Various	TV film
2005	Blake's Junction 7	Travis	Short film
2007	The Last Flight to Kuwait	SAS John	TV film
2007	An Jowl yn Agas Kegin	The Devil	Short film; English title: The Devil In Your Kitchen
2010	Vacant Possession	Mr. Smith	Short film
2011	Dawn of the Dragonslayer	Rogan An Cynan	
2011	Swoosh!	Melter	Short film
2011	World of the Dead: The Zombie Diaries	Maddox	
2011	A Landscape of Lies	Marcus Clancy	
2011	Footless Men	Derik	Short film
2015	Nina Nobody	Mickey	
2015	Mythica: The Necromancer	Betylla	
2016	Light Upon Dark	Micheal	Short film
2016	Downhill	Simon Langston	Short film
2017	Unlocked	Wilson	
2018	Behind You	Charles	Post-production

|- |2018 |Amre |leonid Sobolev

Television
Year	Title	Role	Notes
2003	Adventure Inc.	Robbie	Episode: "Search for Arthur"
2003	My Hero		Episode: "Space Virus"
2003	My Family	Jaak	Episode: "Sixty Feet Under"
2004	Days That Shook the World	Bruce Reynolds	Documentary TV series Episode: "Grand Heist: The Theft of the Crown Jewels/The Great Train Robbery"
2004–2005	Dream Team	Vivian "Jaws" Wright	45 episodes
2005	Broken News	Colin Kay – So News	6 episodes
2006	Doctors	DC Watkins	Episode: "The Tick Tock Man"
2006	Pulling	Gavin	Credited as Phil Brodie; Season 1, Episode 2
2007	Wire in the Blood	D.I Jimmy Lockhart	Episode: "Anything You Could Do"
2007	The Bill	Kevin Frost	Episode: "Good Cop, Bad Cop"
2007	Young Dracula	Ivan	3 episodes
2007, 2009	Katy Brand's Big Ass Show	Various	5 episodes
2008	Doctors	Tony Eggleton	Episode: "Family Ties"
2009–2010	Ideal	Nikolai	3 episodes
2009	Miranda	Robert Husband	Episode: "Dog"
2010	Merlin	Sir Ethan	Episode: "Gwaine"
2011	Not Going Out	Rod	Episode: "Movie"
2013	Family Tree	Earl of Sudbury ("The Plantagenets")	Episode: "The Box"
2014	The Musketeers	Gaudet	Episode: "Friends and Enemies"
2015	The Team	Gavin Jones	2 episodes
2016	Harley and the Davidsons	George M. Hendee	2 episodes
2017	Casualty	Jeremy Warren	Episode: "Sleeping with the Enemy"
2017	EastEnders	DI Fuller	1 episode
2018–2019	The Outpost	Ambassador Everit Dred	Recurring role
