= Camera 40 Productions =

American film production company

Camera 40 Productions is an independent film production company based in Utah, USA. The company was formed in 2001 by filmmakers Jason Faller, Andrew Black and Kynan Griffin while they were attending film school.

== Filmography ==
Released:

- Quietus (2001)
- Pride and Prejudice (2003)
- The Snell Show (2003)
- The Ivy Exchange (2003)
- Moving McAllister (2007)
- "Saga" (2008)
- Orcs! (2011)
- "SAGA: Curse of the Shadow" (2013)
- "Dragonfyre" (2013)
- "Mythica: A Quest for Heroes" (2014)
- "Mythica: The Necromancer" (2015)
- "Mythica: The Iron Crown" (2016)
