= Anand Desai-Barochia =

British actor

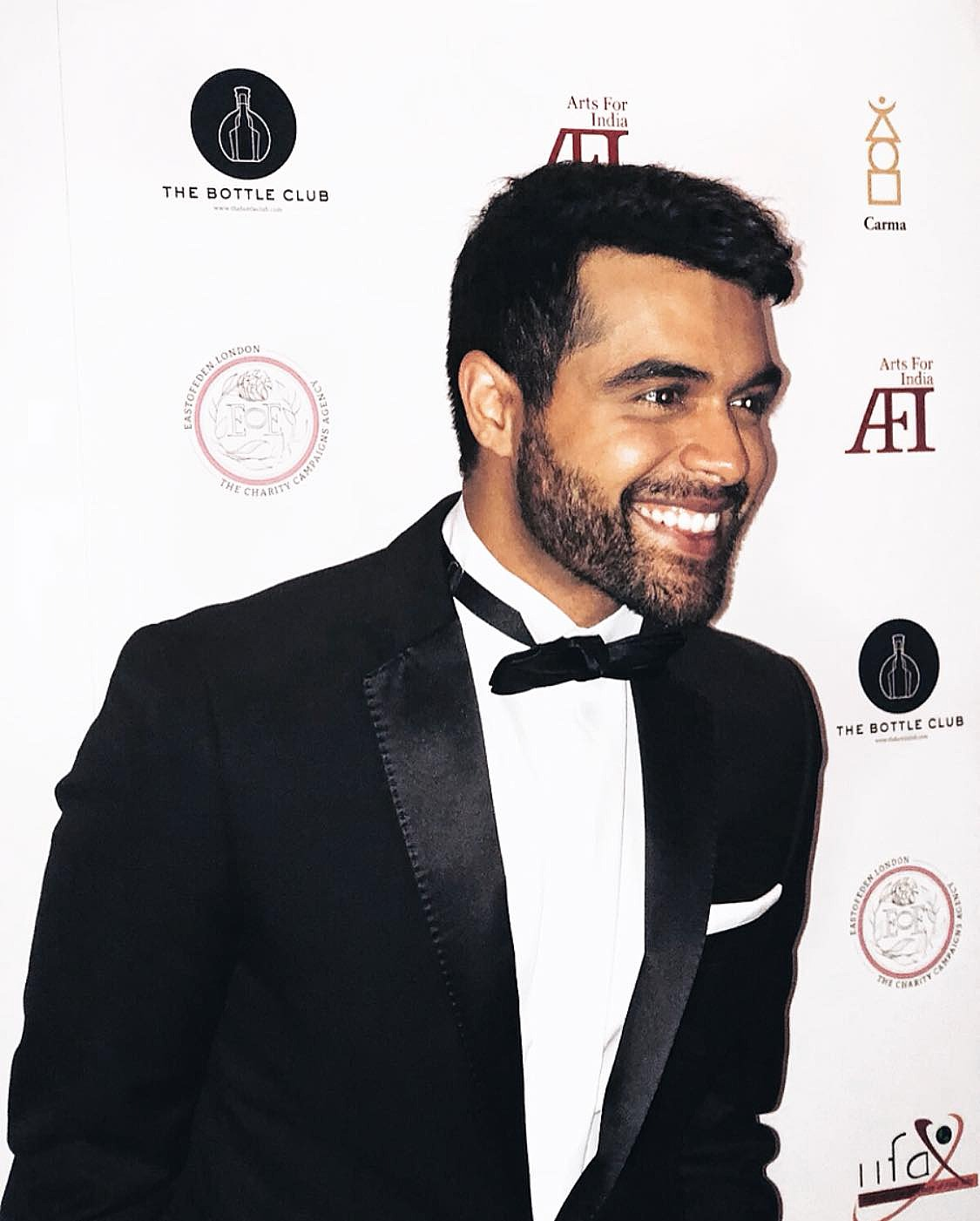
- Anand Desai-Barochia attends Arts For India charity held at BAFTA, London in 2018
- Born: 3 July; Nunthorpe, North Yorkshire, England
- Education: Italia Conti Academy of Theatre Arts
- Occupation: Actor
- Years active: 2008–present

Anand Desai-Barochia (born 3 July) is a British actor. He is best known for his role as Janzo in the CW fantasy series The Outpost (2018–2021) and Bridgerton (2020). Desai-Barochia and Priyanka Chopra's joint campaign with Bumble India premiered in August 2018. The print campaign subsequently aired shortly after.

== Early life ==
Anand Desai-Barochia was born in Nunthorpe, a village in Middlesbrough, North Yorkshire, to a mother who was a neuroradiologist and a father in the hotel industry. He is of Indian descent.

Desai-Barochia was introduced to acting through school, where a teacher gave him the lead role in the graduating play. Desai-Barochia also learned to play the piano to a reasonable standard. At sixteen, after completing his education at Nunthorpe School, Desai-Barochia auditioned and won a full scholarship to the Italia Conti Academy of Theatre Arts in London. After graduating, he studied at the Lee Strasburg Theatre & Film Institute in Los Angeles in 2010.

== Career ==
Desai-Barochia made his screen debut in 2011 as a choir boy in Skins, and land small parts in The Fresh Beat Band , Days of Our Lives and the 2013 film Cavemen. He secured a larger role as Vikram in the movie The Tiger Hunter in 2016, which premiered at the Laemmle Monica Film Center in Santa Monica, California in 2017 and has appeared in 3 episodes of Emmerdale as Sunil Batth in 2017 to 2018. His most successful role to date has been to play the character Janzo the oddball brewer/alchemist in 49 episodes of The CW's The Outpost from 2018 to 2020. Desai-Barochia has worked alongside Jessica Green who plays Talon, and Jake Stormoen who plays Garret for two seasons, with a third series filmed in Serbia in late 2020.

In 2020, Desai-Barochia appeared in the Netflix period drama Bridgerton as Lord Hardy.

Desai-Barochia was promoted to Associate Producer by The CW for an extended 13 episodes of series 3 of The Outpost in 2021. The same year Desai-Barochia Signed with Innovative Artists.

== Advocacy and charity work ==
Desai-Barochia costars alongside Piryanka Chopra empowering women in India through their joint campaign with Bumble. The campaign was successful in championing women to have a voice in a country that hasn't always been so accepting of females at the helm. In India the term “loose” has long been used to denigrate women who choose not to conform to traditional gender norms. Since launch, there have now been over 18 million interactions with women making the first move on Bumble India. (2021)

In October 2023, Desai-Barochia signed the Artists4Ceasefire open letter to Joe Biden, President of the United States, calling for a ceasefire of the Israeli bombardment of Gaza.

== Filmography ==
=== Film ===
Year	Title	Role
2011	A Holiday Heist	Alfred
2013	Bollywood Invasion (Short)	Rahul
2013	Cavemen	Giuseppe
2016	The Tiger Hunter	Vikram
2019	Foster Boy	Sanjay
2020	Lake Mead	Sashi
2022	Presence of Love	Felix

=== Television ===
Year	Title	Role	Notes
2010	Skins	Choir boy	1 episode – "Thomas"
2011	The Fresh Beat Band	Frank	1 episode – "Bollywood Beats"
2011–2013	Days of Our Lives	Ryan / Actor	3 episodes
2016	Tyrant	Male Weapons Maker (Inam)	1 episode – "Ask for the Earth"
2017–2018	Emmerdale	Sunil Batth	3 episodes
2020	Bridgerton	Lord Hardy	2 episodes
2018–2021	The Outpost	Janzo	49 episodes
2022	True Story with Ed and Randall	Rick	1 episode – "Abishek's Story"
2022	Everything's Trash	Gael	1 episode – "Election Night Is Trash"
2023	Leverage: Redemption	Dr. Dunbar	2 episodes
2025	A Keller Christmas Vacation	William	Hallmark TV Movie

=== Self ===
Year	Title	Notes
2010	ITV Evening News	
2013	The Voice UK	
2018	BUILD NYC	
2019	Good Morning LA	
2018–2019	Afterbuzz TV	
