= Andrew Black (director) =

Scottish film director

Andrew Black (born 1974) is a Scottish film director.

Black's film The Snell Show won Best Short at the 2003 Slamdance Film Festival. His first feature film was Pride and Prejudice: A Latter-day Comedy. In 2007 his film Moving McAllister was released. Black has also been involved in TV productions and as a writer for video games.

Black was born in Edinburgh, Scotland. He studied at Edinburgh College of Art and Brigham Young University.

== Sources ==
- Andrew Black at IMDb
- Deseret News, 30 July 2004 article on Pride and Prejudice: A Latter-day Comedy
- Meridian Magazine article on Black
