= The Snell Show =

2003 short film by Andrew Black

- Directed by: Andrew Black
- Written by: Darl Larsen(story); Andrew Black (screenplay)
- Produced by: Anne K. Black; Kynan Griffin; Jennifer Kirkham
- Starring: Jason McCloney; Joanna Major
- Distributed by: Camera 40 Productions
- Release date: 2003
- Running time: 8 min.
- Language: English
- Budget: $5,000

The Snell Show is a short film by Scottish-born director, Andrew Black. The film is a black comedy featuring a nuclear explosion at a family get-together.

The film has multiple levels of meaning. It can be taken as a straightforward satire on nuclear weapons and the Cold War or a commentary on how commonplace and mundane technology has become in our lives. Says director Black: "Both of these were in my mind as I wrote the screenplay — and then 9/11 happened. The world was inundated with visions of collapsing skyscrapers and burning wreckage — and we couldn’t stop watching. For me, the film became more about our fascination with violence and how it is frequently presented as a form of spectacle and entertainment through the media."

Author of the short story, Darl Larsen, adds: "The genre that might be called "nuclear fiction" has always fascinated me, especially the often-banal way we tend to treat the most destructive force in our possession and The Snell Show seemed a fitting tribute to such ambivalence".

After winning the Grand Jury Prize at the 2003 Slamdance Film Festival, The Snell Show went on to play many festivals across the nation, including the HBO US Comedy Arts Festival, Maryland Film Festival, AFI Film Festival, and Finger Lakes Environmental Film Festival.
