= Utah International Film Festival =

American film festival, founded 2011

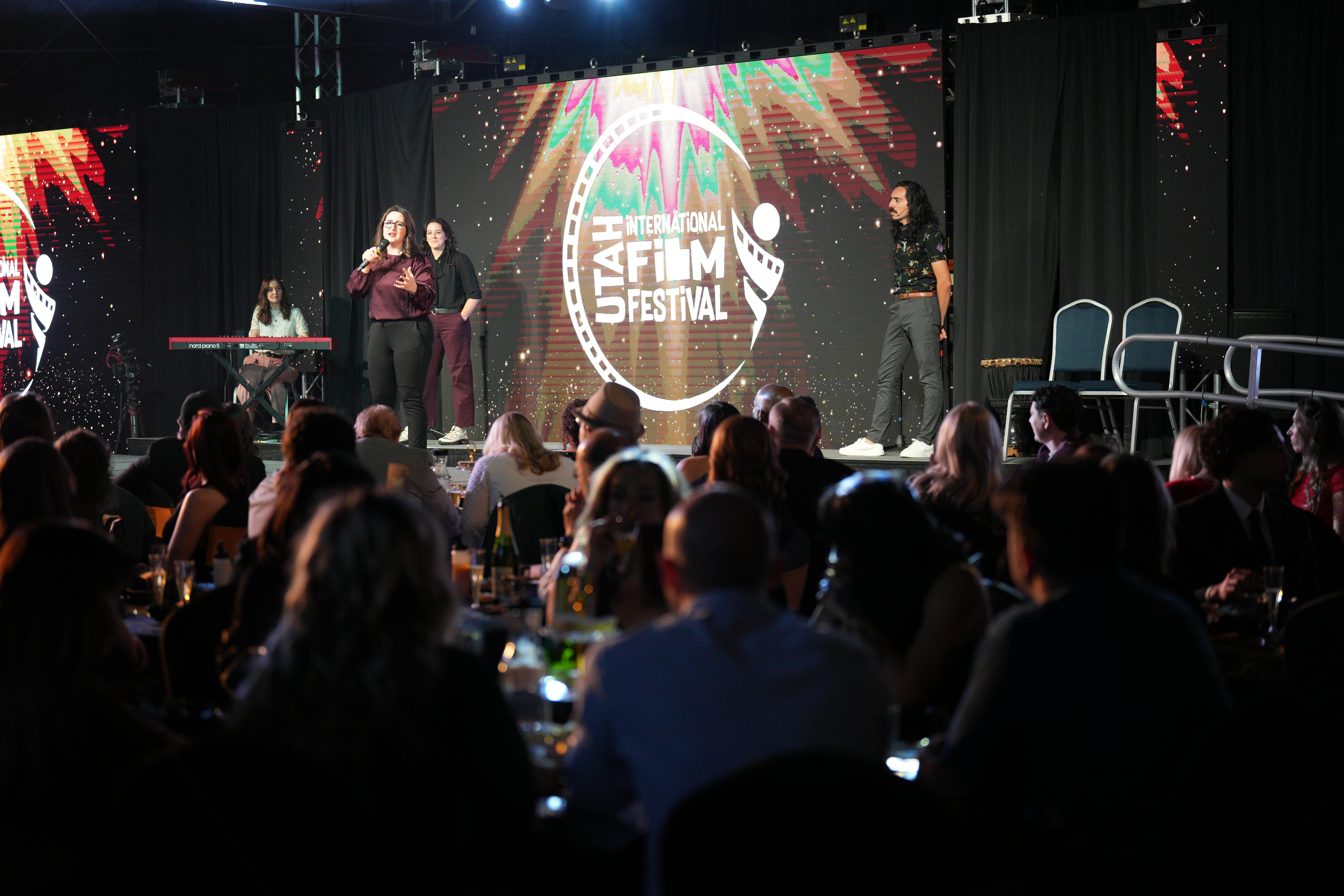
- Utah International Film Festival Gala in 2025.
- Location: Utah County, Utah
- Established: 2011
- Founded by: Warren Workman
- Language: English
- Website: theutahfilmfestival.com

The Utah International Film Festival (UIFF), sometime referred to as the Utah Film Festival, is an annual festival held in Utah County, Utah. The festival predominantly screens and awards independent short films. Although submissions from films produced in Utah are strongly encouraged, UIFF accepts film submissions from around the world.

== History ==
In 2011, Utahn filmmaker Warren Workman started a web series titled Filmed in Utah, highlighting cinematic achievements and personnel from Utah on his YouTube channel. The festival hosted its first iteration the following year as the Filmed in Utah Awards, temporarily located in the back of an Indian restaurant in Provo. In 2015, the festival changed its name to the Utah Film Awards, and expanded its scope to include submissions from outside of Utah.

Since its inception, the festival has moved locations within Utah multiple times; Early iterations were held at Salt Lake Community College in Salt Lake County, and at the Covey Center for the Arts in Provo. The 2026 festival was held at the Mid-Valley Performing Arts Center in Taylorsville, Utah, which is slated to host the 2027 festival.

== Awards ==
The Utah International Film Festival awards short films based on submissions' genres: current categories include comedy, drama, fantasy, horror, sci-fi, thriller, western, experimental, animation, documentary, and narrative films. Technical awards honor achievements in directing, editing, screenwriting, production design, cinematography, sound design, and score. The festival awards in seven acting categories, separated by age and gender: Lead Actress and Actor, Supporting Actress and Actor, Actress and Actor Under 18, and Ensemble cast.

The festival introduced categories championing diverse filmmakers in 2024, honoring individuals who identify as women, BIPOC, and LGBTQ+ respectively. That year, it also introduced categories honoring student filmmakers; today, those categories are split into university film, secondary school films, and elementary school films. In various iterations, the festival has specifically honored films produced in Utah, low-budget films, non-English speaking films, commercial work, and achievement in virtual reality or drone cinematography.
