= Kynan Griffin =

South African film producer

Kynan Lyle Griffin
- Born: 1 January 1979 (age 47); Johannesburg, South Africa
- Occupation: Film producer
- Notable work: Pride and Prejudice: A Latter-Day Comedy, Moving McAllister, Orcs!, Paladin: Dawn of the Dragonslayer, The Crown and the Dragon, Osombie
- Awards: Grand Jury Prize at the 2003 Slamdance Film Festival (The Snell Show)

Kynan Lyle Griffin is a South African film producer in the U.S.

== Early life ==
On 1 January 1979, Griffin was born in Johannesburg, South Africa. Griffin spent most of his formative years in Durban, where he attended Hillcrest High School (South Africa).

== Education ==
Griffin studied film at Brigham Young University in Provo, Utah. As a student, he produced the short film The Snell Show, which won the Grand Jury Prize at the 2003 Slamdance Film Festival.

== Career ==
Griffin produced the feature films Pride and Prejudice: A Latter-Day Comedy, Moving McAllister, Orcs!, Paladin: Dawn of the Dragonslayer, The Crown and the Dragon and Osombie.

Griffin is a producer with Camera 40 Productions and founder of Arrowstorm Entertainment.

Griffin also produced the video-game Saga (2008 video game), the world's first MMORTS, and served as the CFO of the gaming studio Silverlode Interactive.

Griffin was one of the founding members of the Provo Cricket Club. He also sits on the board of directors of the War Child Awareness Fund, a non-profit organization aimed at bringing global attention to the issue of child soldiers.

== Filmography ==
- Moving McAllister (2007) - Producer.

- ORCS! (2011) - Writer. Producer.
