= List of Motorcycle Hall of Fame inductees =

The Motorcycle Hall of Fame has inducted the following people as honorees:

- J. C. Agajanian (1999)
- Giacomo Agostini (1999)
- David Aldana (1999)
- Johnny Allen (1999)
- C.E. Altman (2003)
- Hap Alzina (1998)
- Brad Andres (1998)
- Leonard Andres (1999)
- Leo Anthony, Sr. (1998)
- Sam Arena Sr. (1998)
- Bob Armstrong (1998)
- Erle Armstrong (1998)
- Roy Artley (1998)
- C.R. Axtell (1999)
- Walt Axthelm (2001)
- Speedy Babbs (1999)
- Frank Baer (1998)
- Bill Bagnall (1999)
- David Bailey (1999)
- Gary Bailey (1999)
- Bill Baird (1999)
- Erwin Baker (1998)
- Steve Baker (1999)
- Mike Baldwin (2001)
- George W. Barber (2014)
- Mark Barnett (2001)
- Dave Barr (2000)
- Mike Bast (2000)
- Robert Bates (2009)
- Jean-Michel Bayle (2000)
- Vaughn Beals (2008)
- Rex Beauchamp (2007)
- Ernie Beckman (1998)
- Mike Bell (2001)
- Wells Bennett (2000)
- Ralph Berndt (2005)
- Dick Bettencourt (2000)
- Doug Bingham (2003)
- Ron Bishop (2001)
- Mark Blackwell (2000)
- Joe Bolger (2004)
- Ted Boody Jr. (2000)
- Cliff Boswell (1998)
- Earl Bowlby (1999)
- Eyving Boyesen (2010)
- Jerry Branch (2005)
- Damon Bradshaw (2026)
- Everett Brashear (1998)
- Bob Braverman (2000)
- Mark Brelsford (1998)
- Eddie Brinck (1998)
- Bill Brokaw (2001)
- Becky Brown (2002)
- Bruce Brown (1999)
- Don Brown (2001)
- Willard "Red" Bryan (2004)
- Max Bubeck (1999)
- Earl Buck (1998)
- Mark Buckner (2019)
- Erik Buell (2002)
- Al Burke (1996)
- Edmund Burke (2002)
- Roy Burke (2004)
- Dick Burleson (1998)
- Albert "Shrimp" Burns (1998)
- Rod Bush (2012)
- Ben Campanale (1998)
- Ben Nighthorse Campbell (2001)
- Ricky Carmichael (2013)
- Chris Carr (2004)
- Kel Carruthers (1999)
- Woody Carson (2001)
- Allen Carter (2001)
- Kurt Caselli (2019)
- Woodsie Castonguay (1998)
- Don Castro (2010)
- Tom Cates (2005)
- Danny Chandler (1999)
- Doug Chandler (2006)
- Jimmy Chann (1998)
- Alfred Rich Child (2006)
- T. C. Christenson (2005)
- Bill Church (1998)
- Nobby Clark (2012)
- Charles Clayton (2001)
- Sharon Clayton (2000)
- Floyd Clymer (1998)
- Rod Coates (2008)
- A.B. Coffman (1998)
- Jeff Cole (2016)
- Larry Coleman (motorcyclist) (2010)
- Clark Collins (2010)
- Russ Collins (1999)
- Pete Colman (2000)
- Arthur Constantine (1998)
- Kenny Coolbeth (2022)
- Wes Cooley (2004)
- Dave Coombs (2000)
- Rita Coombs (2023)
- Mike Corbin (2000)
- Carl Cranke (2000)
- Al Crocker (1998)
- Terry Cunningham (2018)
- Wayne T. Curtin (1996)
- Glenn Curtiss (1998)
- Mary Shephard Cutright (1993)
- Wally Dallenbach Sr. (2006)
- Russ Darnell (2002)
- Arthur Davidson (1998)
- Walter Davidson, Sr. (1998)
- William A. Davidson (1998)
- Willie G. Davidson (1999)
- William H. Davidson (1999)
- Gary Davis (2018)
- Jim Davis (1998)
- Ty Davis (2012)
- Will Davis (2002)
- Paul Dean (2001)
- Roger DeCoster (1999)
- Trevor Deeley (1999)
- Babe DeMay (2001)
- Gary Denton (2021)
- Ralph DePalma (1998)
- Jacob DeRosier (1998)
- John DeSoto (1998)
- Marty Dickerson (2002)
- Tony DiStefano (1999)
- Doug Domokos (2002)
- Dick Dorresteyn (1998)
- Floyd Dreyer (1998)
- Linda Dugeau (2004)
- Miguel Duhamel (2016)
- Yvon Duhamel (1999)
- Ryan Dungey (2023)
- Paul DuPont (2004)
- Edison Dye (1999)
- Chet Dykgraaf (1998)
- Skip Eaken (2018)
- Al Eames (1999)
- Ted Edwards (1998)
- Kenny Eggers (1998)
- Mona Ehnes (2009)
- Bud Ekins (1999)
- Dave Ekins (2001)
- Steve Eklund (1998)
- Sprouts Elder (1998)
- Jimmy Ellis (2012)
- David Emde (2010)
- Don Emde (1999)
- Floyd Emde (1998)
- Jeff Emig (2004)
- Donnie Emler Sr (2017)
- Debbie Evans (2003)
- George Everett (2001)
- Michael Farabaugh (2002)
- Jimmy Filice (2000)
- Sue Fish (2012)
- Ed Fisher (2002)
- Earl Flanders (1998)
- Peter Fonda (2002)
- Malcolm Forbes (1999)
- Bob Fox (2009)
- Geoff Fox (2011)
- Fred Fox (2011)
- Bill France Jr. (2000)
- Bill France Sr. (2000)
- Charles Franklin (2016)
- Curley Fredericks (1998)
- Jeff Fredette (2002)
- Rollie Free (1998)
- Walt Fulton Jr. (1999)
- Joe Gee (1998)
- Johnny Gibson (2004)
- Dick Gilmore (1997)
- Linda Giovannoni (1996)
- Broc Glover (2000)
- Paul Goldsmith (1999)
- Randy Goss (1998)
- Bill Goudy (1998)
- Carl Goudy (1998)
- Ricky Graham (1998)
- Morty Graves (1998)
- Bob Greene (2007)
- John and Rita Gregory (2010)
- Al Gunter (1999)
- Mike Hailwood (2000)
- Chris Haines (2016)
- Torsten Hallman (2000)
- Fred Ham (2000)
- Danny Hamel (2013)
- Dick Hammer (2000)
- Bob Hannah (1999)
- Bob Hansen (1999)
- Scot Harden (2008)
- William S. Harley (1998)
- T.K. Hastings (2000)
- Nicky Hayden (2018)
- Larry Headrick (1998)
- Oscar Hedström (1998)
- Tom Heininger (2003)
- George M Hendee (1998)
- Thomas Henderson (1998)
- William G. Henderson (1998)
- Pat Hennen (2007)
- Doug Henry (2005)
- Ralph Hepburn (1998)
- Barry Higgins (2000)
- Bobby Hill (1998)
- Jimmy Hill (1998)
- Pete Hill (1990)
- Lester Hillbish (1998)
- Ted Hodgdon (1998)
- J.C. Hoel (1998)
- Pearl Hoel (1991)
- Soichiro Honda (2000)
- Jules Horky (1998)
- David L. Hough (2009)
- Kent Howerton (2000)
- Billy Huber (1998)
- Larry Huffman (2008)
- Roger Hull (2001)
- Hugh H. (Harry) Hurt (2007)
- JackPine Gypsies Motorcycle Club (1997)
- Don Johns (1998)
- Bill Johnson (2005)
- Rick Johnson (1999)
- Jack Johnson (2016)
- Gary Jones (2000)
- Hap Jones (1998)
- Maldwyn Jones (1998)
- Ronnie Jones (2016)
- Alex Jorgensen (2015)
- Erv Kanemoto (2001)
- Buzz Kanter (2002)
- Pierre Karsmakers (2014)
- Benny Kaufman (1998)
- Neil Keen (2000)
- Corky Keener (2018)
- Harry Kelley Jr. (1999)
- Mike Kidd (1998)
- Mike Kiedrowski (2007)
- Dick Klamfoth (1998)
- Evel Knievel (1999)
- John Kocinski (2015)
- Hazel Kolb (1998)
- Ed Kretz (1998)
- Ed Kretz Jr. (2002)
- Linton Kuchler (2003)
- Del Kuhn (2003)
- Allen La Fortune (2003)
- Brad Lackey (1999)
- Wilbur "Lammy" Lamoreaux (1998)
- Danny LaPorte (2000)
- Mike LaRocco (2014)
- Lars Larsson (2002)
- Eddie Lawson (1999)
- Mert Lawwill (1998)
- Aub LeBard (1998)
- Jay Leno (2000)
- Oscar Lenz (1998)
- Joe Leonard (1998)
- Woody Leone (1998)
- Clifford "Windy" Lindstrom (1998)
- Gunnar Lindstrom (2000)
- Ron “The Machine” Lechien (2019) (Motocross and Supercross)
- Eddie Lojak Sr (2017)
- Jorge Lorenzo (2020)
- Carey Loftin (2001)
- Fred Ludlow (1998)
- Ken Maely (1999)
- Dennis Mahan (2016)
- Walt Mahony (2002)
- Larry Maiers (2001)
- Randy Mamola (2000)
- David Mann (2004)
- Dick Mann (1998)
- Denis Manning (2006)
- Bart Markel (1998)
- Freddie Marsh (2002)
- Billy Mathews (1998)
- Keith McCarty (2015)
- Robert McClean (2002)
- Jim and Phyllis McClure (2001)
- Tom McDermott (2000)
- Norm McDonald (2013)
- Mary McGee (2018)
- Jeremy McGrath (2003)
- Victor McLaglen (1999)
- John McLaughlin (2001)
- Steve McLaughlin (2004)
- Steve McQueen (1999)
- Fred Merkel (2001)
- Joseph Merkel (1998)
- Heikki Mikkola (2006)
- Bill Miller (1998)
- Herby Miller (1998)
- Sammy Miller (2007)
- Cordy Milne (1998)
- Jack Milne (1998)
- Chuck Minert (1999)
- Howard Mitzel (1998)
- Bobby Moore (2017)
- Emmett Moore (1998)
- Steve Morehead (2004)
- Putt Mossman (1999)
- Eddie Mulder (1999)
- Dave Mungenast Sr. (2000)
- Burt Munro (2006)
- Clem Murdaugh (1998)
- Rob Muzzy (2014)
- Cook Neilson (2006)
- Arlen Ness (1992)
- Ed Netterberg (1999)
- Jody Nicholas (1999)
- Nick Nicholson (2005)
- Freddie Nix (1999)
- Gary Nixon (1998)
- Dick O'Brien (2000)
- Johnny O'Mara (2000)
- Bruce Ogilvie (2010)
- Chuck Palmgren (2009)
- Tom Paradise (1998)
- John Parham (2015)
- Scott Parker (2003)
- Trampas Parker (2007)
- Joe Parkhurst (2001)
- Leslie "Red" Parkhurst (1998)
- Mike Parti (2001)
- Leo Payne (2001)
- Bruce Penhall (1999)
- Duke Pennell (2003)
- Jack Penton (1999)
- John Penton (1998)
- Tom Penton (2000)
- Dave Perewitz (2003)
- Dudley Perkins (1998)
- Bob Perry (1998)
- Stu Peters (2011)
- Joe Petrali (1998)
- Preston Petty (1999)
- Jimmy Phillips (1998)
- Reggie Pink (1998)
- Doug Polen (2011)
- Jim Pomeroy (1999)
- Terry Poovey (2008)
- Ray Price (1993)
- Reg Pridmore (2002)
- Wayne Rainey (1999)
- Ronnie Rall (2001)
- Cal Rayborn II (1999)
- John Reed (2001)
- Herb Reiber (1998)
- Roger Reiman (1998)
- Randy Renfrow (2013)
- Carroll Resweber (1998)
- Gene Rhyne (1998)
- Jim Rice (2001)
- Branscombe Richmond (2003)
- Derek and Don Rickman (2007)
- Joel Robert (2000)
- J.N. Roberts (1999)
- Kenny Roberts (1998)
- Dot Robinson (1998)
- Earl Robinson (1998)
- Roxy Rockwood (1999)
- George Roeder (1999)
- Larry Roeseler (1999)
- Gene Romero (1998)
- Sylvester H. Roper (2002)
- Rip Rose (2000)
- Scott Russell (2005)
- Perry Sands (2004)
- Robert Schanz (2004)
- Phil Schilling (2011)
- Donny Schmit (2002)
- Bernie Schreiber (2000)
- Dave Schultz (2001)
- Kevin Schwantz (1999)
- Ignaz Schwinn (1998)
- Gary Scott (1998)
- Hank Scott (2000)
- Bubba Shobert (1998)
- Tom Sifton (1998)
- Dale Singleton (2002)
- Brian Slark (2012)
- Dal Smilie (2004)
- Donnie Smith (1995)
- E.C. Smith (1999)
- Erwin Smith (1995)
- George J. Smith Sr. (1994)
- Jeff Smith (2000)
- Malcolm Smith (1998)
- Marty Smith (2000)
- Rodney Smith (2015)
- Roger Soderstrom (2006)
- Cristine Sommer-Simmons (2003)
- Freddie Spencer (1999)
- Johnny Spiegelhoff (1998)
- Jay Springsteen (2003)
- Jeff Stanton (2000)
- Peter Starr (2017)
- Orie Steele (2007)
- Gary L. Stevens (2002)
- James Stewart, JR (2022)
- Bessie Stringfield (2002)
- Gloria Struck (2016)
- Scott Summers (2014)
- Babe Tancrede (1998)
- Sammy Tanner (1999)
- Lee Taylor (1998)
- Richard Teerlink (2015)
- Shell Thuet (2001)
- John Tibben (2004)
- Rolf Tibblin (2008)
- Walter and Lucille Timme (1995)
- Kenny Tolbert (2022)
- Fred Toscani (2003)
- Mike and Dianne Traynor (2013)
- Elmer Trett (2000)
- Marty Tripes (2001)
- Gavin Trippe (2005)
- Bill Tuman (1998)
- U.S. Trophee and MX des Nations Team, 1981 (2003)
- Joe Uebelacker (1998)
- Pete Uebelacker (1998)
- Billy Uhl (2007)
- John Ulrich (2017)
- Skip Van Leeuwen (1999)
- A.F. Van Order (1998)
- Augusta and Adeline Van Buren (2002)
- Terry Vance (1999)
- Don Vesco (1999)
- Craig Vetter (1999)
- Ryan Villopoto (2021)
- Ed Waldheim (2007)
- Gene Walker (1998)
- Otto Walker (1998)
- Theresa Wallach (2003)
- Miny Waln (1998)
- Buzz Walneck (2004)
- Bruce Walters (2003)
- Jeff Ward (1999)
- Joe Weatherly (1998)
- Jimmy Weinert (1999)
- Ray Weishaar (1998)
- Bill Werner (2000)
- Ralph White (2001)
- Tom White (2014)
- Earl Widman (1998)
- Al Wilcox (2012)
- Jack Wilson (2001)
- Margaret Wilson (2004)
- Melbourne Wilson (2006)
- Leroy Winters (1999)
- Steve Wise (2001)
- Charles "Red" Wolverton (1998)
- George A. Wyman (2000)
- Pops Yoshimura (2000)
- Ed Youngblood (1999)
- David Zien (2000)

== Class of 2024 ==
- Mike Lafferty
- Debbie Matthews
- Mat Mladin
- Rob Rasor
- Kevin Windham

== Class of 2025 ==
- Dana Bell
- Chris Carter
- Colin Edwards
- Joe Kopp
- Chad Reed
- Ryan Young
