= Harley and the Davidsons =

- Genre: Historical drama
- Starring: Michiel Huisman; Robert Aramayo; Bug Hall; Daniel Coonan; Philip Brodie; Annie Read; Essa O'Shea; Hera Hilmar
- Composer: Mateo Messina
- Country of origin: United States
- Original language: English
- No. of seasons: 1
- No. of episodes: 3

Production
- Executive producers: John Goldwyn; Dimitri Doganis; Evan Wright; Ciarán Donnelly
- Producer: Peter McAleese
- Cinematography: Balazs Bolygo
- Production companies: John Goldwyn Productions; Raw Productions

Original release
- Network: Discovery Channel
- Release: September 5 – September 7, 2016

Harley and the Davidsons is a 2016 American television miniseries directed by Ciarán Donnelly and Stephen Kay, and co-written by Nick Schenk, Evan Wright and Seth Fisher which dramatizes the origins of motorcycle manufacturer Harley-Davidson, and how Arthur Davidson founded the company together with his brothers Walter Davidson, Sr. and William A. Davidson, along with their childhood friend William S. Harley.

It stars Robert Aramayo as William Harley, Bug Hall as Arthur Davidson and Michiel Huisman as Walter Davidson, and premiered on the Discovery Channel as a "three-night event series" on September 5, 2016.

== Cast ==
Starring

- Michiel Huisman as Walter Davidson
- Bug Hall as Arthur Davidson
- Robert Aramayo as Bill Harley

Supporting cast

- Daniel Coonan as William "Big Bill" Davidson
- Gabriel Luna as Eddie Hasha
- Philip Brodie as George M. Hendee
- Tommy Bastow as Otto Walker
- Wilson Bethel as Ray Weishaar
- Alex Shaffer as Albert "Shrimp" Burns
- Dougray Scott as Randall James
- Stephen Rider as William B. Johnson
- Jessica Camacho as Reya
- Sean H. Scully as Walter C. Davidson
- Annie Read as Anna Jachthuber / Anna Harley
- Essa O'Shea as Clara Beisel / Clara Davidson
- Hera Hilmar as Emma Rosenheim/Emma Davidson
- Bobby Schofield as young veteran

== Episodes ==
No. overall	No. in series	Title	Directed by	Written by	Original US airdate	Viewers (millions)
1	1	"Amazing Machine"	Ciaran Donnelly	Evan Wright	September 5, 2016	3.40
Part one starts in 1903 when Walter Davidson is forced to transfer his farm and land to the C.M.P. Railroad, he uses the property money to fund his business-scheming younger brother Arthur and his friend and engineering student Bill Harley after seeing their designs to develop a new motorbike using a Flying Merkel bicycle frame and a homemade engine. They establish the Harley-Davidson Motor Company in their hometown of Milwaukee, Wisconsin with a financial backer, and start production on their bikes. To boost sales, Walter puts his life at risk by testing their creation in a series of enduro-races against the industry standard, Indian Motorcycles, led by its founder George Hendee. But the death of their former racer and friend during a competition on the deadly Motordrome makes them question the future of racing on these steeply-banked wooden tracks.
2	2	"Race to the Top"	Stephen Kay	Teleplay by : Nick Schenk and Nick Schenk and Seth Fisher	September 6, 2016	3.36
After boycotting the blood-sport of Motordrome racing, Harley-Davidson returns to racing on a dirt flat-track with their bigger, faster, more powerful bikes. They get a new rival when Hendee appoints his successor, engineer Randell James as chairman of Indian Motorcycles, who becomes a threat. To beat him and his team captain Gene Walker, Arthur assembles a new race team as Walter enlists a teenage hot-shot. While racing in Dodge City, Kansas in 1916, they become known as "The Wrecking Crew" because of their tough image. On April 6, 1917, the U.S. government establishes the Federal Fuel Administration as they enter World War I, forbidding non-essential businesses to use coal and oil. Instead of giving it up, they negotiate a contract with the military to build 25,000 rugged war bikes for soldiers. Harley-Davidson now becomes the biggest motorcycle company in America. But James sues them with a class-action lawsuit for patent infringement on Indian's clutch design. Even though its Harley's original design, he never patented it, leading to layoffs and losing the whole production line. To avoid bankruptcy, Walter settles and starts from scratch with their very first bike.
3	3	"Legacy"	Ciaran Donnelly	Story by : Evan Wright; Teleplay by : Evan Wright and Nick Schenk	September 7, 2016	3.34
As the Great Depression looms in the country, Harley and the Davidson brothers are faced with their biggest decision for the company to stay in business. With declining sales bringing them once again to the brink of bankruptcy, Edsel Ford offers them to participate in a joint venture, manufacturing Servi-Car tricycles under the Ford brand name. Harley-Davidson declines, instead choosing to sell the Servi-Car themselves, and partner with Sankyo Seiyaku Corporation in Japan for their overseas operations. The company then takes on their most ambitious project to date: the Knucklehead. Meanwhile, Walter's son Walter Jr. befriends a band of outlaw racers congregating at an abandoned factory, one of them being William B. Johnson, who would later be known as the first African-American Harley-Davidson dealer. Walter Jr.'s rebellious behavior earns him the ire of both his father and the police, at one point attempting to race a prototype motorcycle without his parents' permission. He later gained his father's respect, and was eventually given the opportunity to race the newly-minted Knucklehead. The final scene shows Bill Harley and Arthur Davidson watching as the Knucklehead goes through a speed trial, with Bill calling it "the fastest damn motorcycle in the world."

== Historical accuracy ==
While the series is largely based on actual events, and is lauded for its use of reproductions of motorcycles from the era, a number of creative liberties were made for dramatic effect, notably with the rivalry between Harley and Indian, with George Hendee and the fictional Randell James being portrayed as arrogant and manipulative executives bent at defeating Harley through underhanded corporate schemes such as patent trolling and bribery.

Some of the races and other subplots depicted in the miniseries were either fictitious or highly dramatized, particularly when Hendee challenges his competitors to an endurance contest hosted by his company, culminating in a fist fight between Hendee and Walter Davidson over dealership owners being bribed into selling Indian motorcycles exclusively, and a heated argument between the Davidson brothers following the dealership bribery incident.

Eddie Hasha's death was downplayed in the Motordrome sequence, where he collided into a wall after avoiding a fellow racer; in reality Hasha's motorcycle suddenly turned sharply into the rail surrounding the track, killing a boy who had put his head over the rail to watch the race. The racer flew out into the grandstands, killing him instantly. Three other boys and a young man were also killed. In addition, Hasha's involvement with the company in the first episode was exaggerated and expanded upon, although he did indeed become friends with co-founder Arthur Davidson when he worked at a Dallas dealership and raced a motorcycle loaned by the company, in contrast to not being able to represent Harley and betraying in favor of Indian as depicted in the miniseries.

Arthur Davidson's proposal of 20,000 motorcycles to the United States military for World War I was also fictionalized; Indian provided 41,000 units for the military effort while Harley produced 15,000.

While the founders unveiled their 1936 EL at an outlaw race in the third episode, a pre-production version of the real-world EL was revealed in a 1935 dealers convention at the Schroeder Hotel in Milwaukee. In addition, the Knucklehead moniker as mentioned by Bill Harley in the episode didn't come into popular use until after World War II, when a revision to the OHV engine, later known as the Panhead, was introduced.

== Reception ==
On the review aggregation website Rotten Tomatoes, the miniseries has an approval rating of 80% based on ten reviews, with an average rating of 5.9/10. The site's critics consensus reads: "Good acting and fun action sequences lift Harley and the Davidsons from longform advertisement into a celebration of the storied motorcycle brand." On Metacritic, Harley and the Davidsons holds a score of 57 out of 100, based on eight critics, indicating "mixed or average reviews".

Larry Lawrence of the motorcycling news magazine CycleNews gave the series a mixed to negative review, stating that it was "by most accounts a highly entertaining watch", but was critical of the highly dramatized portrayal of the company and its founders, particularly the Harley/Indian rivalry which culminated in an unresolved cliffhanger with the infringement case in the second episode, and the events of the third episode, where Harley unveiled their new motorcycle in a (fictional) outlaw race.

=== Reaction from the company ===
The show received positive reception from Harley-Davidson themselves. Bill Davidson, great-grandson of the original founders, and Bill Jackson, head of the company archives at the Harley-Davidson Museum, commended the producers' efforts in recreating the motorcycles and the era, saying "they really did their homework", but noted William A. Davidson's reduced role in the story despite the latter being one of the key founders.
