= Houston Film Critics Society Awards 2011 =

Annual US film awards ceremony

5th Houston Film Critics Society Awards
- Date: January 7, 2012
- Location: Museum of Fine Arts; Houston, Texas
- Country: United States
- Presented by: Houston Film Critics Society
- Website: houstonfilmcritics.com/awards

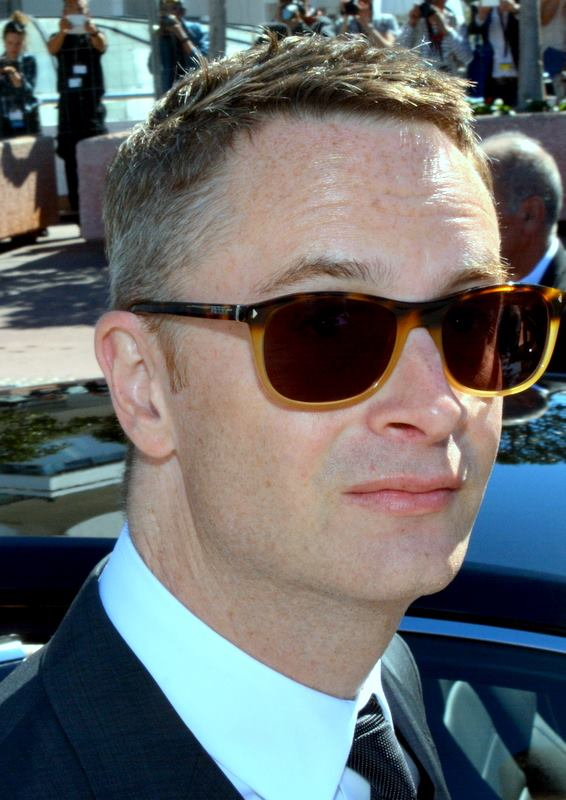
Nicolas Winding Refn at the Cannes Film Festival, 2016

The 5th Houston Film Critics Society Awards were announced on December 14, 2011. These awards for "extraordinary accomplishment in film" are presented annually by the Houston Film Critics Society (HFCS) based in Houston, Texas. The organization, founded in 2007, includes 26 film critics for print, radio, television, and internet publications in the greater Houston area. The awards are co-sponsored by the Houston Film Commission, WorldFest, and the Houston Cinema Arts Society.

The nominations for the 2011 awards were announced on December 10, 2011. Eligible films do not need to have played or opened in a Houston movie theater prior to the nomination deadline, merely made available to the HFCS membership at a screening or on DVD. Along with the usual 13 "best of" category awards, this year also continued the category for "Worst Movies of the Year" and introduced a new category for "Best Texas Independent Film". The Artist led the field with seven nominations, including the Best Picture, Actor, Direction, Screenplay, Cinematography, Original Score, and Foreign Language categories. The Descendants and The Help each received five nominations.

The Descendants was the HFCS's most awarded film of 2011 taking top honors in the Best Picture, Best Supporting Actress (Shailene Woodley), and Best Screenplay (Alexander Payne, Nat Faxon, Jim Rash) categories. Drive was the only other film to garner multiple awards, winning both Best Director (Nicolas Winding Refn) and Supporting Actor (Albert Brooks) prizes.

The other acting honors went to Tilda Swinton as Best Actress for We Need to Talk About Kevin and Michael Fassbender as Best Actor for Shame. The other individual awards included Best Original Score to Ludovic Bource for The Artist and Best Cinematography to Emmanuel Lubezki for The Tree of Life.

The remaining category honors went to Rango as Best Animated Film, Project Nim as Best Documentary, and South Korea's I Saw the Devil as Best Foreign Language Film. "Life's A Happy Song" by Bret McKenzie from The Muppets was named the Best Original Song. The HFCS's second annual award for "Worst Picture" was given to Your Highness starring Natalie Portman.

In addition to the category awards, the HFCS announced that 2011's Lifetime Achievement Award will honor actor Jeff Bridges and the 2011 Humanitarian Award honors Houston socialite Joanne King Herring. She was selected for "her work in Afghanistan, as noted in the film Charlie Wilson's War". (Julia Roberts portrayed Herring in the 2007 film.) The HFCS awards for Outstanding Achievement in Cinema were presented to Hunter Todd and Mary Lampe. A special Technical Achievement honor was announced for Rise of the Planet of the Apes.

== Ceremony ==
The 2011 awards will be presented at a ceremony to be held at the Museum of Fine Arts on January 7, 2012. The award ceremony is free and open to the general public. While organizers do not expect any of the nominees in the "best of" category awards to be in attendance, recipients in some individual categories are scheduled to attend. The ceremony will also include clips of nominated films plus special tributes, and will be followed by a catered reception with the members of the HFCS in the museum gallery.

A new award will be presented for the first time during the ceremony: Best Texas Independent Film, for "a work mostly financed and filmed in Texas". The nominees are Deadbeat TV, Volume 2 from Invisible Studios, The Great American Moon Rock Caper from Flock of Film Productions, Jacob from Odyssee Pictures, Puncture from Millennium Entertainment, and Stick 'Em Up from Shoot Edit Sleep. The winner of this category will be announced at the January 7 ceremony.

== Winners and nominees ==
Winners are listed first and highlighted with boldface.

=== Category awards ===
Best Picture	Best Direction of a Motion Picture
**The Descendants**; Drive; Extremely Loud and Incredibly Close; Midnight in Paris; Take Shelter; The Artist; The Help; The Tree of Life; War Horse; Win Win	**Nicolas Winding Refn** - Drive; Woody Allen - Midnight in Paris; Michel Hazanavicius - The Artist; Terrence Malick - The Tree of Life; Alexander Payne - The Descendants
Best Performance by an Actor in a Leading Role	Best Performance by an Actress in a Leading Role
**Michael Fassbender** - Shame; George Clooney - The Descendants; Jean Dujardin - The Artist; Brad Pitt - Moneyball; Michael Shannon - Take Shelter	**Tilda Swinton** - We Need to Talk About Kevin; Viola Davis - The Help; Elizabeth Olsen - Martha Marcy May Marlene; Meryl Streep - The Iron Lady; Michelle Williams - My Week with Marilyn
Best Performance by an Actor in a Supporting Role	Best Performance by an Actress in a Supporting Role
**Albert Brooks** - Drive; Armie Hammer - J. Edgar; Christopher Plummer - Beginners; Andy Serkis - Rise of the Planet of the Apes; Alex Shaffer - Win Win	**Shailene Woodley** - The Descendants; Jessica Chastain - The Help; Melissa McCarthy - Bridesmaids; Janet McTeer - Albert Nobbs; Octavia Spencer - The Help
Best Screenplay	Best Animated Feature Film
**Alexander Payne**, **Nat Faxon**, **Jim Rash** - The Descendants; Woody Allen - Midnight in Paris; Michel Hazanavicius - The Artist; Tom McCarthy - Win Win; Will Reiser - 50/50	**Rango**; The Adventures of Tintin: The Secret of the Unicorn; Happy Feet Two; Kung Fu Panda 2; Puss in Boots; Winnie the Pooh
Best Cinematography	Best Documentary Feature
**Emmanuel Lubezki** - The Tree of Life; Janusz Kamiński - War Horse; Robert Richardson - Hugo; Guillaume Schiffman - The Artist; Newton Thomas Sigel - Drive	**Project Nim**; Buck; Cave of Forgotten Dreams; The Elephant in the Living Room; Undefeated
Best Foreign Language Film	Best Original Score
**I Saw the Devil** • South Korea; 13 Assassins • Japan; The Artist • France; Elite Squad: The Enemy Within • Brazil; The Skin I Live In • Spain	**Ludovic Bource** - The Artist; Alexandre Desplat - Harry Potter and the Deathly Hallows – Part 2; Harry Escott - Shame; John Williams - The Adventures of Tintin: The Secret of the Unicorn; John Williams - War Horse
Best Original Song	Worst Picture
**"Life's A Happy Song"** by Bret McKenzie - The Muppets; "Lay Your Head Down" by Brian Byrne & Glenn Close; Albert Nobbs; "Star-Spangled Man" by Alan Menken & David Zippel; Captain America: The First Avenger; "The Living Proof" by Mary J. Blige - The Help; "Think You Can Wait" by The National - Win Win	**Your Highness**; Jack and Jill; Red Riding Hood; The Sitter; The Smurfs; The Twilight Saga: Breaking Dawn - Part 1
Best Texas Independent Film	
**(Winner announced January 7, 2012)**; **Puncture** from Millennium Entertainment; Deadbeat TV, Volume 2 from Invisible Studios; The Great American Moon Rock Caper from Flock of Film Productions; Jacob from Odyssee Pictures; Stick 'Em Up from Shoot Edit Sleep	

=== Individual awards ===
==== Lifetime Achievement Award ====
- **Jeff Bridges**

==== Humanitarian Award ====
- **Joanne King Herring**

==== Outstanding Achievement ====
- **Hunter Todd**
- **Mary Lampe**

==== Technical Achievement ====
- **Rise of the Planet of the Apes**
