= Houston Film Critics Society Award for Best Supporting Actor =

Annual US film award

Houston Film Critics Society Award for Best Actress
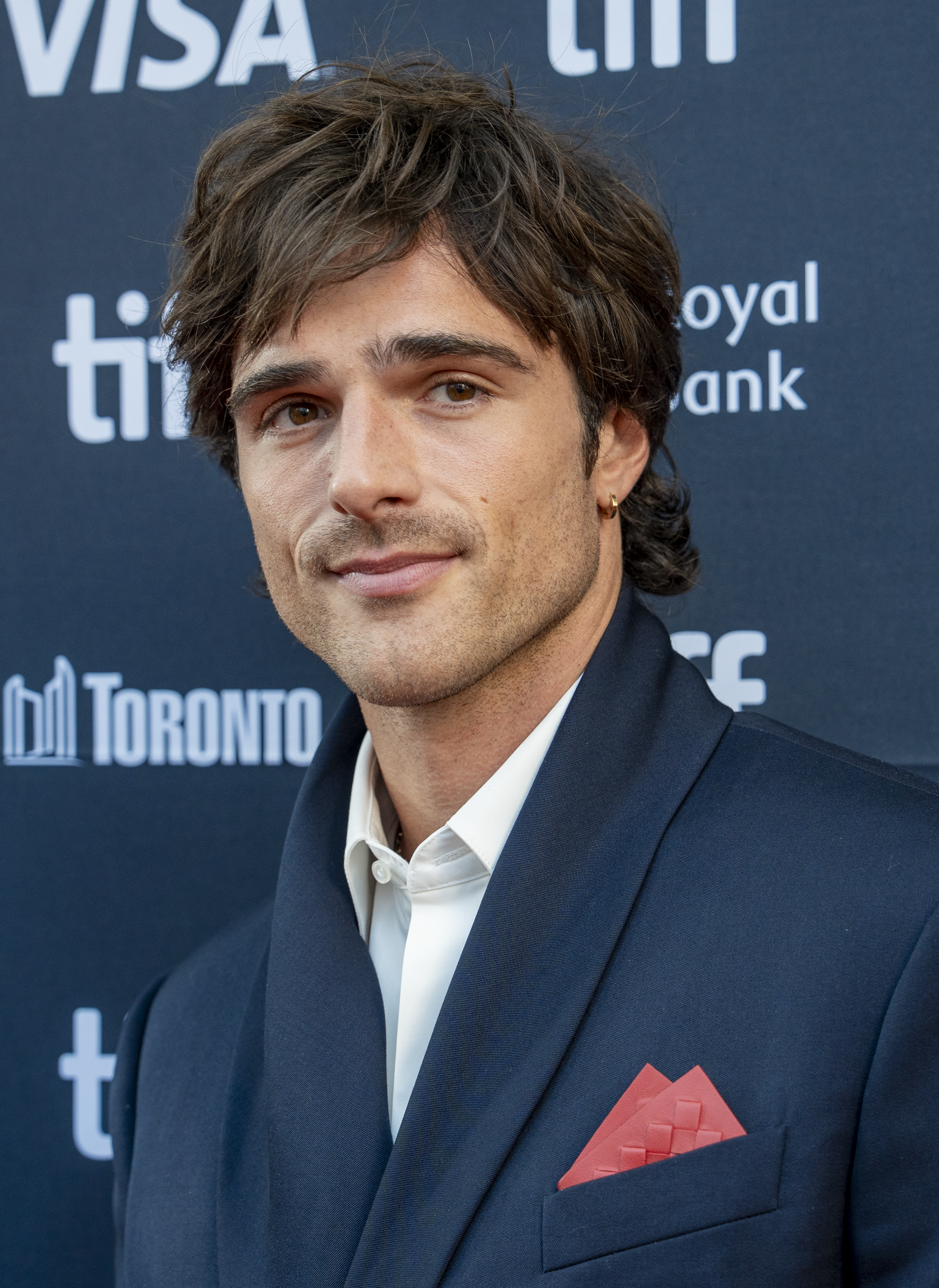
- The 2025 recipient: Jacob Elordi
- Awarded for: Best Performance by an Actress in a Leading Role
- Country: United States
- Presented by: Houston Film Critics Society
- First award: Javier Bardem; No Country for Old Men (2007)
- Currently held by: Jacob Elordi; Frankenstein (2025)
- Website: houstonfilmcritics.org

The Houston Film Critics Society Award for Best Supporting Actor is an annual award given by the Houston Film Critics Society.

== Winners ==
- † = Winner of the Academy Award for Best Supporting Actor
- ‡ = Nominated of the Academy Award for Best Supporting Actor

=== 2000s ===
Year	Winner and nominees	Film	Role
2007	Javier Bardem †	No Country for Old Men	Anton Chigurh
2007	Casey Affleck ‡	The Assassination of Jesse James by the Coward Robert Ford	Robert Ford
2007	Hal Holbrook ‡	Into the Wild	Ron Franz
2007	Philip Seymour Hoffman ‡	Charlie Wilson's War	Gust Avrakotos
2007	Tom Wilkinson ‡	Michael Clayton	Arthur Edens
2008	Heath Ledger †	The Dark Knight	The Joker
2008	Josh Brolin ‡	Milk	Dan White
2008	Tom Cruise	Tropic Thunder	Les Grossman
2008	Robert Downey Jr. ‡	Tropic Thunder	Kirk Lazarus
2008	Brad Pitt	Burn After Reading	Chad Feldheimer
2009	Christoph Waltz †	Inglourious Basterds	Colonel Hans Landa
2009	Zach Galifianakis	The Hangover	Alan Garner
2009	Woody Harrelson ‡	The Messenger	Capt. Tony Stone
2009	Christian McKay	Me and Orson Welles	Orson Welles
2009	Stanley Tucci ‡	The Lovely Bones	George Harvey

=== 2010s ===
Year	Winner and nominees	Film	Role
2010	Christian Bale †	The Fighter	Dicky Eklund
2010	Andrew Garfield	The Social Network	Eduardo Saverin
2010	Bill Murray	Get Low	Frank Quinn
2010	Jeremy Renner ‡	The Town	James "Jem" Coughlin
2010	Geoffrey Rush ‡	The King's Speech	Lionel Logue
2011	Albert Brooks	Drive	Bernie Rose
2011	Armie Hammer	J. Edgar	Clyde Tolson
2011	Christopher Plummer †	Beginners	Hal Fields
2011	Andy Serkis	Rise of the Planet of the Apes	Caesar
2011	Alex Shaffer	Win Win	Kyle Timmons
2012	Tommy Lee Jones ‡	Lincoln	Thaddeus Stevens
2012	Alan Arkin ‡	Argo	Lester Siegel
2012	Javier Bardem	Skyfall	Raoul Silva
2012	Philip Seymour Hoffman ‡	The Master	Lancaster Dodd
2012	Matthew McConaughey	Magic Mike	Dallas
2013	Jared Leto †	Dallas Buyers Club	Rayon
2013	Barkhad Abdi ‡	Captain Phillips	Abduwali Muse
2013	Michael Fassbender ‡	12 Years a Slave	Edwin Epps
2013	James Gandolfini	Enough Said	Albert
2013	Matthew McConaughey	Mud	Mud
2014	J. K. Simmons †	Whiplash	Terence Fletcher
2014	Josh Brolin	Inherent Vice	Det. Christian F. "Bigfoot" Bjornsen
2014	Ethan Hawke ‡	Boyhood	Mason Evans Sr.
2014	Edward Norton ‡	Birdman	Mike Shiner
2014	Mark Ruffalo ‡	Foxcatcher	Dave Schultz
2014	Andy Serkis	Dawn of the Planet of the Apes	Caesar
2015	Tom Hardy ‡	The Revenant	John Fitzgerald
2015	Mark Ruffalo ‡	Spotlight	Michael Rezendes
2015	Mark Rylance †	Bridge of Spies	Rudolf Abel
2015	Michael Shannon	99 Homes	Rick Carver
2015	Sylvester Stallone ‡	Creed	Rocky Balboa
2016	Jeff Bridges ‡	Hell or High Water	Marcus Hamilton
2016	Ben Foster	Hell or High Water	Tanner Howard
2016	Lucas Hedges ‡	Manchester by the Sea	Patrick Chandler
2016	Dev Patel ‡	Lion	Saroo Brierley
2016	Michael Shannon ‡	Nocturnal Animals	Detective Bobby Andes
2017	Sam Rockwell †	Three Billboards Outside Ebbing, Missouri	Jason Dixon
2017	Willem Dafoe ‡	The Florida Project	Bobby Hicks
2017	Richard Jenkins ‡	The Shape of Water	Giles
2017	Patrick Stewart	Logan	Charles Xavier/Professor X
2017	Michael Stuhlbarg	Call Me by Your Name	Mr. Perlman
2018	Mahershala Ali †	Green Book	Don Shirley
2018	Timothée Chalamet	Beautiful Boy	Nic Sheff
2018	Adam Driver ‡	BlacKkKlansman	Detective Flip Zimmerman
2018	Richard E. Grant ‡	Can You Ever Forgive Me?	Jack Hock
2018	Michael B. Jordan	Black Panther	Erik Killmonger
2019	Brad Pitt †	Once Upon a Time in Hollywood	Cliff Booth
2019	Willem Dafoe	The Lighthouse	Thomas Wake
2019	Anthony Hopkins ‡	The Two Popes	Pope Benedict XVI
2019	Al Pacino ‡	The Irishman	Jimmy Hoffa
2019	Joe Pesci ‡	The Irishman	Russell Bufalino

=== 2020s ===
Year	Winner and nominees	Film	Role
2020	Leslie Odom Jr. ‡	One Night in Miami...	Sam Cooke
2020	Chadwick Boseman	Da 5 Bloods	"Stormin'" Norman Earl Holloway
2020	Sacha Baron Cohen ‡	The Trial of the Chicago 7	Abbie Hoffman
2020	Bill Murray	On the Rocks	Felix Keane
2020	Paul Raci ‡	Sound of Metal	Joe
2021	Kodi Smit-McPhee ‡	The Power of the Dog	Peter Gordon
2021	Andrew Garfield	The Eyes of Tammy Faye	Jim Bakker
2021	Ciarán Hinds ‡	Belfast	Pop
2021	Troy Kotsur †	CODA	Frank Rossi
2021	J. K. Simmons ‡	Being the Ricardos	William Frawley
2022	Ke Huy Quan †	Everything Everywhere All at Once	Waymond Wang
2022	Brendan Gleeson ‡	The Banshees of Inisherin	Colm Doherty
2022	Barry Keoghan ‡	The Banshees of Inisherin	Dominic Kearney
2022	Mark Rylance	Bones and All	Sully
2022	Ben Whishaw	Women Talking	August
2023	Ryan Gosling ‡	Barbie	Ken
2023	Robert De Niro ‡	Killers of the Flower Moon	William King Hale
2023	Robert Downey Jr. †	Oppenheimer	Lewis Strauss
2023	Mark Ruffalo ‡	Poor Things	Duncan Wedderburn
2023	Dominic Sessa	The Holdovers	Angus Tully
2024	Kieran Culkin †	A Real Pain	Benji Kaplan
2024	Yura Borisov ‡	Anora	Igor
2024	Edward Norton ‡	A Complete Unknown	Pete Seeger
2024	Guy Pearce ‡	The Brutalist	Harrison Lee Van Buren
2024	Jeremy Strong ‡	The Apprentice	Roy Cohn
2025	Jacob Elordi ‡	Frankenstein	The Creature
2025	Benicio del Toro ‡	One Battle After Another	Sensei Sergio St. Carlos
2025	Delroy Lindo ‡	Sinners	Delta Slim
2025	Paul Mescal	Hamnet	William Shakespeare
2025	Sean Penn ‡	One Battle After Another	Col. Steven J. Lockjaw
2025	Stellan Skarsgård ‡	Sentimental Value	Gustav Borg
