= Motocross of Nations =

Annual team motocross race

Monster Energy Motocross of Nations
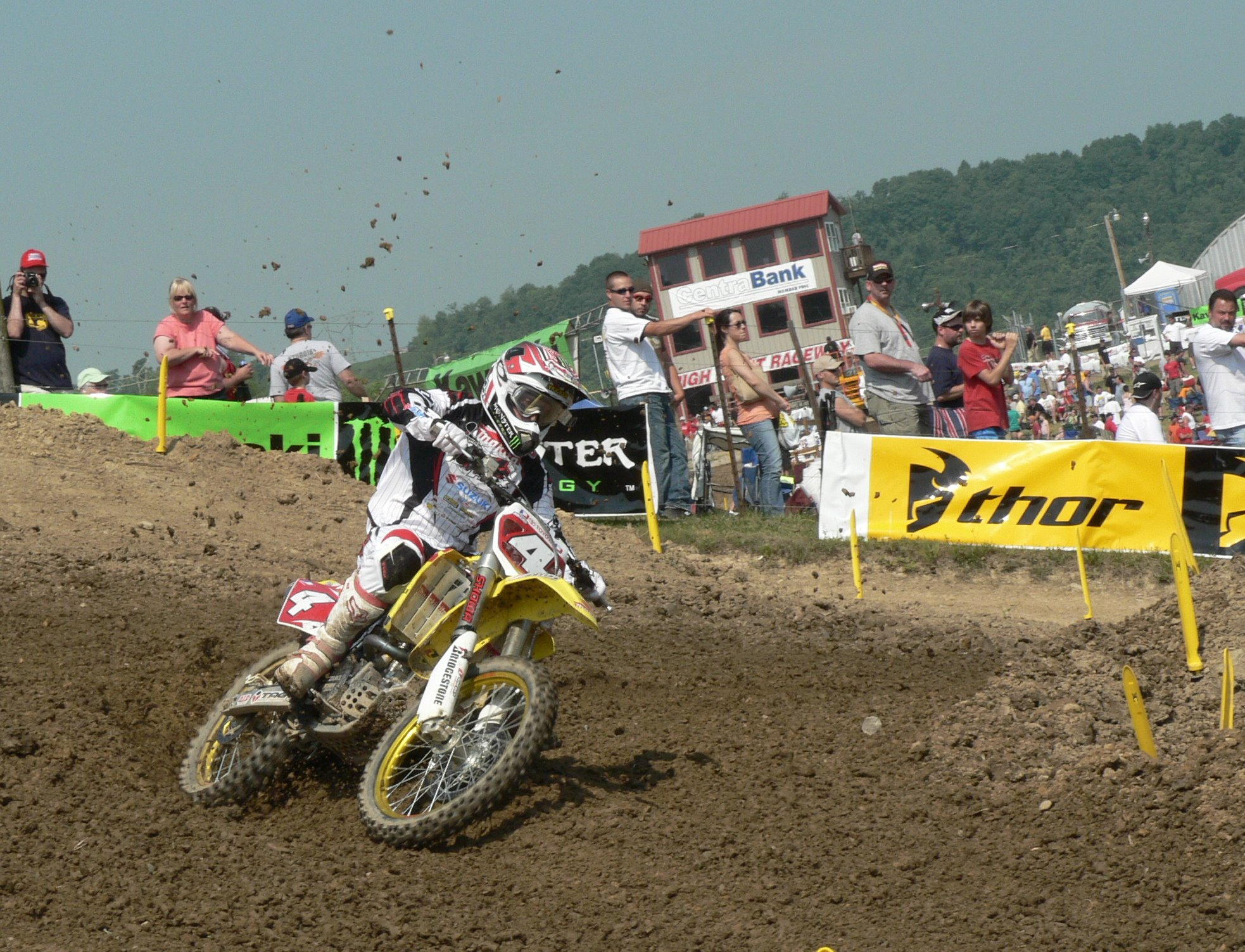
- Ricky Carmichael individual and overall winner in 2005.
- Category: Motocross
- Region: International
- Inaugural season: 1947
- Classes: MXGP; MX2; Open
- Teams' champion: Belgium (2026)
- Official website: website

The Motocross of Nations (MXON), also known by its original French name Motocross des Nations (MXDN) is an annual team motocross race, where riders representing their country meet at what is billed as the "Olympics of Motocross". The event has been staged since 1947, where the team of Bill Nicholson, Fred Rist and Bob Ray, representing the United Kingdom, took home the Chamberlain Trophy for the first time.

The event as it stands today is an amalgamation of three separate events: the original Motocross des Nations, raced with 500cc motorcycles; the Trophée des Nations, raced with 250cc motorcycles; and the Coupe des Nations, for 125cc motorcycles. Before 1984, the three events were held in different locations on different weekends, whereafter they were combined into a single event with one rider per class.

The scoring for the event works on the position system, i.e. first place is awarded one point, second place two, etc. Each class (currently MXGP, MX2 and Open) races twice, each time against one of other two classes, for a total of three races. The worst score of three races is dropped, and the lowest combined score wins.

The event's name has been officially anglicised since 2004, when Youthstream was awarded promotional rights for the World Motocross Grand Prix, although the general moniker Des Nations or MXDN is still very much in use. Races are streamed live on the MXGP website.

Historically, the United Kingdom dominated the early years. With the rise of motocross in North America from the 1970s, the United States embarked on a famous winning streak of 13 years from 1981 to 1993.

== Motocross des Nations winners ==
Year	Location	Winning team	Winning riders
1947	(Netherlands) Wassenaar	(United Kingdom) Great Britain	Bill Nicholson / Bob Ray / Fred Rist
1948	(Belgium) Spa	Belgium	Cox / Jansen / Milhoux
1949	(United Kingdom) Brands Hatch	(United Kingdom) Great Britain	Harold Lines / Bob Manns / Ian Soovell
1950	(Sweden) Värnamo-Skillingaryd	(United Kingdom) Great Britain	John Draper / Basil Hall / Harold Lines
1951	(Belgium) Namur	Belgium	Jansen / Leloup / Meunier
1952	(United Kingdom) Brands Hatch	(United Kingdom) Great Britain	Les Archer Jr. / Brian Stonebridge / Geoff Ward
1953	(Sweden) Värnamo-Skillingaryd	(United Kingdom) Great Britain	Les Archer Jr. / John Draper / Geoff Ward
1954	(Netherlands) Norg	(United Kingdom) Great Britain	Curtis / Brian Stonebridge / Geoff Ward
1955	(Denmark) Randers	Sweden	Lars Gustavsson / Sten Lundin / Bill Nilsson
1956	(Belgium) Namur	(United Kingdom) Great Britain	John Draper / Jeff Smith/ Geoff Ward
1957	(United Kingdom) Brands Hatch	(United Kingdom) Great Britain	Curtis / Martin / Jeff Smith
1958	(Sweden) Knutstorp	Sweden	Lars Gustavsson / Ove Lundell / Bill Nilsson
1959	(Belgium) Namur	(United Kingdom) Great Britain	John Draper / Rickman / Jeff Smith
1960	(France) Cassel	(United Kingdom) Great Britain	Curtis / Rickman / Jeff Smith
1961	(Netherlands) Schijndel	Sweden	Ove Lundell / Bill Nilsson / Rolf Tibblin
1962	(Switzerland) Wohlen	Sweden	Jan Johansson / Ove Lundell / Rolf Tibblin
1963	(Sweden) Knutstorp	(United Kingdom) Great Britain	John Burton / Don Rickman / Derek Rickman / Arthur Lampkin / Jeff Smith
1964	(United Kingdom) Hawkstone Park	(United Kingdom) Great Britain	Don Rickman / Derek Rickman / Jeff Smith
1965	(Belgium) Namur	(United Kingdom) Great Britain	Arthur Lampkin / Vic Eastwood / Jeff Smith
1966	(France) Rémalard	(United Kingdom) Great Britain	Dave Bickers / Vic Eastwood / Derek Rickman
1967	(Netherlands) Markelo	(United Kingdom) Great Britain	Dave Bickers / Vic Eastwood/ Jeff Smith
1968	(Soviet Union) Chișinău	(Soviet Union) USSR	Arnis Angers/ Evgeni Petushkov / Vladimir Pogrebniak / Leonid Shinkarenko
1969	(United Kingdom) Farleigh Castle	Belgium	Roger De Coster / Sylvain Geboers / Joël Robert / Jef Teeuwissen
1970	(Italy) Maggiora	Sweden	Bengt Aberg / Christer Hammargren / Ake Jonsson / Arne Kring
1971	(France) Vannes	Sweden	Bengt Aberg / Christer Hammargren / Ake Jonsson / Olle Petersson
1972	(Netherlands) Norg	Belgium	Roger De Coster / Rene Van de Vorst / Jaak van Velthoven
1973	(Switzerland) Wohlen	Belgium	Roger De Coster / Sylvain Geboers / René Heeren / Jaak van Velthoven
1974	(Sweden) Stockholm	Sweden	Bengt Aberg / Hakan Andersson / Ake Jonsson / Arne Kring
1975	(Czechoslovakia) Sedlčany	Czechoslovakia	Bavorovský / Churavý / Naváček / Velký
1976	(Netherlands) Sint Anthonis	Belgium	Roger De Coster / Harry Everts / Gaston Rahier / Jaak van Velthoven
1977	(France) Cognac	Belgium	Roger De Coster / André Malherbe / Jean-Paul Mingles / Jaak van Velthoven
1978	(West Germany) Gaildorf	(Soviet Union) USSR	Kavinov / Khudiakov / Korneev / Guennady Moisseev
1979	(Sweden) Stockholm	Belgium	Roger De Coster / Harry Everts / André Malherbe / Ivan Van Den Broek
1980	(United Kingdom) Farleigh Castle	Belgium	Georges Jobé / André Malherbe / Ivan Van Den Broek / André Vromans
1981	(West Germany) Bielstein	(United States) USA	Donnie Hansen / Danny LaPorte / Johnny O'Mara / Chuck Sun
1982	(Switzerland) Wohlen	(United States) USA	David Bailey / Danny Chandler / Jim Gibson / Johnny O'Mara
1983	(Belgium) Angreau	(United States) USA	David Bailey / Mark Barnett / Broc Glover / Jeff Ward
1984	(Finland) Vantaa	(United States) USA	David Bailey / Rick Johnson / Johnny O'Mara / Jeff Ward
1985	(West Germany) Gaildorf	(United States) USA	David Bailey / Ron Lechien / Jeff Ward
1986	(Italy) Maggiora	(United States) USA	David Bailey / Rick Johnson / Johnny O'Mara
1987	(United States) Unadilla	(United States) USA	Bob Hannah / Rick Johnson / Jeff Ward
1988	(France) Villars-sous-Écot	(United States) USA	Rick Johnson / Ron Lechien / Jeff Ward
1989	(West Germany) Gaildorf	(United States) USA	Mike Kiedrowski / Jeff Stanton / Jeff Ward
1990	(Sweden) Vimmerby	(United States) USA	Damon Bradshaw / Jeff Stanton / Jeff Ward
1991	(Netherlands) Valkenswaard	(United States) USA	Damon Bradshaw / Mike Kiedrowski / Jeff Stanton
1992	(Australia) Manjimup	(United States) USA	Jeff Emig / Mike LaRocco / Billy Liles
1993	(Austria) Schwanenstadt	(United States) USA	Jeff Emig / Mike Kiedrowski / Jeremy McGrath
1994	(Switzerland) Roggenburg	(United Kingdom) Great Britain	Rob Herring / Paul Malin / Kurt Nicoll
1995	(Slovakia) Sverepec	Belgium	Marnicq Bervoets / Stefan Everts / Joël Smets
1996	(Spain) Jerez de la Frontera	(United States) USA	Jeff Emig / Steve Lamson / Jeremy McGrath
1997	(Belgium) Nismes	Belgium	Marnicq Bervoets / Stefan Everts / Joël Smets
1998	(United Kingdom) Foxhills	Belgium	Marnicq Bervoets / Patrick Caps / Stefan Everts
1999	(Brazil) Indaiatuba	Italy	Andrea Bartolini / Alessio Chiodi/ Claudio Federici
2000	(France) Saint-Jean-d'Angély	(United States) USA	Ricky Carmichael / Ryan Hughes / Travis Pastrana
2001	(Belgium) Namur	France	Yves Demaria / Luigi Seguy / David Vuillemin
2002	(Spain) Bellpuig	Italy	Andrea Bartolini / Alessio Chiodi / Alessandro Puzar
2003	(Belgium) Zolder	Belgium	Stefan Everts / Steve Ramon / Joël Smets
2004	(Netherlands) Lierop	Belgium	Stefan Everts / Steve Ramon / Kevin Strijbos
2005	(France) Ernée	(United States) USA	Ricky Carmichael / Kevin Windham / Ivan Tedesco
2006	(United Kingdom) Matterley Basin	(United States) USA	James Stewart Jr. / Ryan Villopoto / Ivan Tedesco
2007	(United States) Budds Creek	(United States) USA	Ricky Carmichael / Ryan Villopoto / Tim Ferry
2008	(United Kingdom) Donington Park	(United States) USA	James Stewart Jr. / Ryan Villopoto / Tim Ferry
2009	(Italy) Franciacorta	(United States) USA	Ryan Dungey / Jake Weimer / Ivan Tedesco
2010	(United States) Lakewood	(United States) USA	Ryan Dungey / Trey Canard / Andrew Short
2011	(France) Saint-Jean-d'Angély	(United States) USA	Ryan Dungey / Blake Baggett / Ryan Villopoto
2012	(Belgium) Lommel	Germany	Maximilian Nagl / Ken Roczen / Marcus Schiffer
2013	(Germany) Teutschenthal	Belgium	Ken De Dycker / Jeremy Van Horebeek / Clément Desalle
2014	(Latvia) Ķegums	France	Gautier Paulin / Dylan Ferrandis / Steven Frossard
2015	(France) Ernée	France	Gautier Paulin / Marvin Musquin / Romain Febvre
2016	(Italy) Maggiora	France	Gautier Paulin / Benoît Paturel / Romain Febvre
2017	(United Kingdom) Matterley Basin	France	Gautier Paulin / Christophe Charlier / Romain Febvre
2018	(United States) Red Bud	France	Gautier Paulin / Dylan Ferrandis / Jordi Tixier
2019	(Netherlands) Assen	Netherlands	Jeffrey Herlings / Calvin Vlaanderen / Glenn Coldenhoff
2020	(France) Ernée	Cancelled due to the COVID-19 pandemic.	
2021	(Italy) Mantua	Italy	Antonio Cairoli / Mattia Guadagnini / Alessandro Lupino
2022	(United States) Red Bud	(United States) USA	Eli Tomac / Justin Cooper / Chase Sexton
2023	(France) Ernée	France	Romain Febvre / Tom Vialle / Maxime Renaux
2024	(United Kingdom) Matterley Basin	Australia	Hunter Lawrence / Kyle Webster / Jett Lawrence
2025	(United States) Ironman	Australia	Jett Lawrence / Kyle Webster / Hunter Lawrence
2026	(France) Ernée	Belgium	Lucas Coenen / Sacha Coenen / Liam Everts
2027	(Netherlands) Assen	TBD	TBD
2028	(United States) TBA	TBD	TBD
2029	(France) TBA	TBD	TBD
2030	TBA	TBD	TBD
2031	(United States) TBA	TBD	TBD
2032	TBA	TBD	TBD
2033	(France) TBA	TBD	TBD

== Participating nations 2000–2026 ==
Team	(France) 2000	(Belgium) 2001	(Spain) 2002	(Belgium) 2003	(Netherlands) 2004	(France) 2005	(United Kingdom) 2006	(United States) 2007	(United Kingdom) 2008	(Italy) 2009	(United States) 2010	(France) 2011	(Belgium) 2012	(Germany) 2013	(Latvia) 2014	(France) 2015	(Italy) 2016	(United Kingdom) 2017	(United States) 2018	(Netherlands) 2019	(Italy) 2021	(United States) 2022	(France) 2023	(United Kingdom) 2024	(United States) 2025	(France) 2026
Argentina																		30th	22nd						27th	
Australia	7th	6th		14th	13th	16th	11th	20th	6th	7th	6th	3rd	10th	4th	14th	7th	8th	6th	4th	15th		3rd	2nd	1st	1st	9th
Austria	13th				22nd	23rd	21st			23rd	12th	20th	24th	12th		10th	15th		12th	17th	9th			20th	21st	19th
Belarus				27th																						
Belgium	3rd	2nd	2nd	1st	1st	3rd	2nd	3rd	3rd	3rd	2nd	5th	2nd	1st	2nd	3rd	4th	4th	6th	2nd	6th	5th	5th	16th	4th	1st
Brazil	23rd	23rd						16th	14th	14th	18th	27th	32nd	31st	27th	27th	24th	23rd	16th	24th		25th	17th	13th	12th	17th
Bulgaria																					18th					
Canada	28th	26th			8th	17th	18th	10th	13th	27th	16th			23rd	17th		10th	13th	10th		14th	15th	25th	15th	22nd	14th
Chile								18th														16th	26th	29th	24th	
China							30th					35th														
Costa Rica								26th			24th														32nd	
Croatia	17th	24th		28th	25th		29th			29th		30th		34th	32nd	30th	31st	27th		30th	26th		30th	32nd		29th
Cyprus						29th				36th										33rd						
Czech Republic	9th	12th	8th	10th	16th	18th	16th	17th	25th	21st		14th	21st	15th	25th	22nd	16th	22nd	15th	26th	17th		15th	14th		21st
Denmark	15th	19th	12th	12th	21st	20th	23rd		20th	15th		18th	18th	14th	15th	15th	14th	11th		10th	10th			11th	20th	20th
Dominican Republic								30th																		
Ecuador								22nd			21st											31st				
Estonia	24th	11th	7th	8th	4th	6th	9th	11th	12th	8th	15th	10th	7th	10th	9th	4th	9th	8th	9th	4th	7th	19th	11th	19th	13th	12th
FIM Asia																									28th	
FIM Europe																						27th				
FIM Latin America																						30th	24th	31st	30th	27th
Finland	8th	10th	3rd	3rd	6th	11th	10th		11th	18th	14th	17th	20th	18th	16th	28th	29th	31st			12th	14th	18th	26th	23rd	23rd
France	18th	1st	6th	9th	3rd	2nd	5th	2nd	2nd	2nd	7th	2nd	6th	5th	1st	1st	1st	1st	1st	5th	5th	2nd	1st	5th	3rd	10th
Germany	10th	5th	16th	19th	11th	14th	13th	9th	10th	4th	3rd	7th	1st	7th	5th	9th	22nd	20th	9th	7th	11th	8th	4th	6th	15th	16th
(United Kingdom) Great Britain	4th	4th		6th	9th	5th	6th	5th	4th	5th	4th	4th	8th	6th	4th	18th	7th	3rd	3rd	3rd	3rd	10th	10th	12th	16th	7th
Greece		30th				28th	27th	25th		32nd		33rd	31st	36th	31st	32nd	35th	34th		31st	30th		37th	35th		
Guam																						17th	28th			
Guatemala					27th	25th		23rd			26th								27th							
Honduras																						29th			37th	
Hungary	27th	29th				27th	26th			31st			28th	28th	26th		27th	33rd								
Iceland								29th	30th	30th	30th	32nd	30th	37th			36th	29th	24th	27th	29th	28th	31st	36th	34th	32nd
(Republic of Ireland) Ireland	11th	14th	9th	7th	14th	22nd	31st	13th	21st	16th	20th	19th	13th	22nd	19th	17th	20th	15th	13th	18th	22nd	23rd	27th	23rd	29th	25th
Israel														40th	34th	36th	38th	38th	29th			33rd			26th	
Italy	2nd	17th	1st	17th	15th	13th	4th	4th	5th	6th	5th	16th	5th	3rd	6th	14th	5th	7th	DQ	16th	1st	4th	3rd	8th	6th	6th
Japan	6th			5th	17th	12th	12th	7th	17th		19th	13th	26th	24th	22nd	20th	18th		21st	29th		24th		27th	11th	22nd
Kuwait												36th														
Latvia	16th	18th	13th	18th	23rd	26th	24th	15th	16th	17th	17th	22nd	14th	16th	12th	19th	32nd	25th		8th	15th	11th	12th	10th	9th	4th
Lithuania	30th	31st		26th					28th	35th	28th	31st	22nd	26th	24th	25th	19th	35th		28th	13th	22nd	23rd	33rd		28th
Luxembourg					26th									38th	33rd	34th	37th	37th		34th			35th			
Mexico								27th			27th								25th			26th	29th		33rd	30th
Mongolia									32nd	33rd																
Morocco			17th													35th					31st	32nd	34th		31st	26th
Netherlands	32nd	15th		20th	2nd	7th	22nd		18th	19th		9th	4th	11th	10th	6th	2nd	2nd	2nd	1st	2nd	7th	19th	3rd	19th	3rd
New Zealand	19th	3rd		4th	7th	4th	3rd		8th	11th	8th	29th	15th	20th	23rd	8th	17th	21st	17th	19th		21st	14th	22nd		
Norway	25th	22nd		15th	20th		20th		27th	25th		26th	17th	19th		23rd		24th		12th		13th	16th	17th	18th	24th
Philippines											29th								28th			34th				
Poland														25th	28th	24th	30th	32nd		21st	21st		33rd	34th		
Portugal	14th	8th	14th	23rd	10th	8th	14th	19th	24th	13th	9th	11th	9th	17th	13th	16th	21st	16th	20th	22nd	27th		21st	28th		
Puerto Rico								28th	19th	26th	10th	24th	23rd	21st	18th	33rd	26th	17th	18th	32nd			32nd		36th	
Romania														32nd										30th		
Russia	29th	21st		21st	18th	24th	25th		22nd	22nd		15th	11th	8th	8th	12th	11th	14th		25th	4th					
San Marino																	34th									
Slovakia		25th		25th			15th		29th	24th				35th	29th	26th	28th	19th			25th		22nd	25th		18th
Slovenia	21st	13th	11th	16th	24th	21st	28th		26th	28th		23rd	16th	27th	20th	21st	23rd	12th		13th	24th		9th	7th	5th	13th
South Africa	5th	9th		11th	5th	9th	7th	12th	15th	9th		6th	27th				25th	26th	23rd	20th	20th	18th	13th	18th	14th	15th
Spain	12th	16th	4th	24th	12th	10th	8th	6th	7th	12th	13th	8th	25th	13th	21st	11th	12th	18th	7th	9th	16th	6th	7th	4th	10th	2nd
Sweden	20th	7th	5th	13th	19th	19th	19th	14th	23rd	20th	22nd	21st	12th	30th	11th	13th	13th	10th	11th	14th	19th	12th	20th	21st	7th	11th
Switzerland	22nd	20th	10th	22nd		15th	18th	8th	9th	10th	11th	12th	19th	9th	7th	5th	6th	5th	19th	11th	8th	9th	6th	9th	8th	8th
Thailand										34th		34th	33rd	39th				36th								
United States	1st			2nd		1st	1st	1st	1st	1st	1st	1st	3rd	2nd	3rd	2nd	3rd	9th	5th	6th		1st	8th	2nd	2nd	5th
Ukraine	31st	28th						21st			25th	28th		29th	30th	31st	33rd	28th	26th	23rd	28th		36th		35th	31st
Uruguay																									25th	
Venezuela	26th	27th	15th					24th	31st		23rd	25th	29th	33rd		29th			14th		23rd	20th		24th	17th	
Total	32	31	17	28	27	29	31	30	32	36	30	36	33	40	34	36	38	38	30	34	31	34	37	36	37	32

== Participating nations pre-2000 ==
Team	(Germany) 1985	(Italy) 1986	(United States) 1987	(France) 1988	(Germany) 1989	(Sweden) 1990	(Netherlands) 1991	(Australia) 1992	(Austria) 1993	(Switzerland) 1994	(Slovakia) 1995	(Spain) 1996	(Belgium) 1997	(United Kingdom) 1998	(Brazil) 1999
Andorra				23rd											
Argentina															16th
Australia	20th	7th	16th	4th	7th	7th	10th	6th	13th	17th	14th	19th	11th	16th	8th
Austria	11th	23rd		12th	12th	13th	13th	9th	8th	9th	12th	17th	18th	29th	
Belarus										29th	31st				
Belgium	8th	22nd	3rd	10th	9th	2nd	2nd	2nd	2nd	4th	1st	3rd	1st	1st	3rd
Brazil													27th	31st	14th
Canada	10th	16th	12th		13th								17th		
Chile															18th
Croatia									21st	22nd	24th	23rd	22nd	28th	12th
Czechoslovakia	6th	10th		14th	11th		16th	14th							
Czech Republic									11th	15th	10th	10th	13th	8th	
Denmark	12th	12th	8th	16th	16th	9th	9th	8th	9th	11th	13th	16th	9th	13th	
East Germany						21st									
Estonia									16th	21st	18th	13th	25th	10th	17th
Finland	7th	4th	9th	3rd	22nd	10th	6th		15th	14th	9th	9th	19th	2nd	11th
France	9th	8th	5th	2nd	6th	12th	23rd	4th	25th	3rd	3rd	2nd	5th	12th	2nd
Germany	3rd	9th	4th	8th	5th	8th	7th	15th	6th	5th	8th	4th	6th	6th	9th
(United Kingdom) Great Britain	5th	2nd	10th	9th	3rd	6th	5th	3rd	4th	1st	4th	14th	3rd	7th	5th
Greece	17th	18th			20th		21st		28th					30th	
Hong Kong		21st													
Hungary							24th		19th	23rd	26th	25th	28th	23rd	
(Republic of Ireland) Ireland	15th	15th		18th	17th	17th	17th	12th	26th	13th	21st	11th	14th	24th	
Italy	4th	3rd	6th	7th	2nd	4th	8th		23rd	20th	19th	8th	2nd	11th	1st
Japan						15th	14th					20th		17th	10th
Latvia								11th	17th	25th	30th	21st	21st	22nd	
Lithuania									29th	30th	28th	22nd	30th		
Luxembourg		24th		19th	4th	11th	22nd		22nd	31st	29th		31st	27th	
Netherlands	2nd	5th	2nd	5th	10th	5th	3rd	7th	24th	6th	5th	5th	10th	4th	6th
New Zealand			17th	17th			20th	10th	5th	16th	7th	6th	7th	3rd	
Norway	21st				18th	14th	11th		10th	12th	22nd		26th	25th	
Poland	18th	19th		22nd	21st	22nd									
Portugal	19th	20th		21st						26th	17th	24th	24th	21st	13th
Russia									18th	27th	25th		32nd	26th	
San Marino		11th	11th	13th											
Slovakia										24th	15th		23rd	18th	15th
Slovenia									27th	18th	23rd	12th	12th	9th	20th
/ South Africa							12th	16th	7th	8th	16th		16th	19th	
Soviet Union						18th	19th								
Spain		14th	14th	11th	14th	19th	15th		14th	10th	11th	15th	15th	15th	7th
Sweden	14th	6th	7th	6th	8th	3rd	4th	5th	3rd	7th	6th	7th	4th	20th	
Switzerland	13th	13th	13th	15th	15th	16th	18th	13th	12th	19th	20th	18th	20th	14th	
Ukraine									20th	28th	27th		29th		
United States	1st	1st	1st	1st	1st	1st	1st	1st	1st	2nd	2nd	1st	8th	5th	4th
Uruguay															19th
(Socialist Federal Republic of Yugoslavia) Yugoslavia	16th		15th	20th	19th	20th									
Total	21	24	17	23	22	22	24	16	29	31	31	25	32	31	20

== Participating nations: 500cc-only era ==
Team	(Sweden) 1958	(Belgium) 1959	(France) 1960	(Netherlands) 1961	(Switzerland) 1962	(Sweden) 1963	(United Kingdom) 1964	(Belgium) 1965	(France) 1966	(Netherlands) 1967	(Soviet Union) 1968	(United Kingdom) 1969	(Italy) 1970	(France) 1971	(Netherlands) 1972	(Switzerland) 1973	(Sweden) 1974	(Czech Republic) 1975	(Netherlands) 1976	(France) 1977	(Germany) 1978	(Finland) 1979	(United Kingdom) 1980	(Germany) 1981	(Switzerland) 1982	(Belgium) 1983	(Finland) 1984
Austria																							8th	10th	5th		
Belgium	7th	4th	3rd	6th	3rd	3rd	2nd	2nd	2nd	3rd		1st	2nd	2nd	1st	1st	10th	2nd	1st	1st	3rd	1st	1st	3rd	2nd	2nd	2nd
/ Canada							7th																			11th	
(Czech Republic) Czechoslovakia												4th	3rd	3rd	4th			1st	12th		7th						
Denmark	5th	6th	6th	4th	8th	6th	6th	5th	7th	7th		7th	10th	11th	6th	10th	7th	11th	8th	9th	11th	7th	12th	12th	11th	9th	10th
East Germany									9th	5th	2nd																
Finland										8th	5th			5th	12th	7th	12th	4th	7th	10th	14th	8th	9th	9th	14th		5th
France	3rd	3rd	4th	3rd	6th	4th	5th	4th	5th	9th	3rd	5th	9th	8th	8th	8th	6th	14th	9th	6th	8th	11th	7th	8th	7th	6th	11th
Germany			8th														11th	12th	3rd	7th	2nd	3rd	3rd	4th	9th	5th	7th
(United Kingdom) Great Britain	2nd	1st	1st	2nd	2nd	1st	1st	1st	1st	1st		3rd	4th	4th	5th	5th	4th	3rd	6th	3rd	5th	2nd	4th	2nd	3rd	3rd	4th
(Republic of Ireland) Ireland												8th									12th		11th	11th	12th	12th	
Italy	6th	8th	7th		5th				10th				6th	9th	11th	12th		7th	13th	5th	10th		6th	14th	4th	7th	8th
Luxembourg																							10th	15th	10th	4th	6th
Netherlands	4th	5th	5th	7th	7th		3rd	6th	6th	4th		6th	5th	6th	3rd	6th	5th	6th	2nd	8th	9th	5th	2nd	7th	6th	8th	9th
New Zealand																											13th
Norway															9th	11th	9th	8th	11th	12th		9th	13th				
Romania											4th																
Sweden	1st	2nd	2nd	1st	1st	2nd	8th	7th	3rd	2nd		2nd	1st	1st	2nd	2nd	1st	13th	14th	4th	6th	6th	5th	5th	8th		3rd
Switzerland		7th	9th	5th	4th	7th	4th	3rd	8th	10th	6th	9th	8th	7th	10th	9th	8th	10th	10th	11th	13th	10th	14th	13th	13th	10th	12th
United States														10th	7th	4th	2nd	9th	5th	2nd	4th			1st	1st	1st	1st
(Soviet Union) USSR						5th			4th	6th	1st		7th	12th		3rd	3rd	5th	4th		1st	4th		6th			
Total	7	8	9	7	8	7	8	7	10	10	6	9	10	12	12	12	12	14	14	12	14	11	14	15	14	12	13

== Trophée des Nations winners ==
Year	Location	Team	Riders
1961	Avigliana, Italy	(United Kingdom) Great Britain	Jeff Smith / Dave Bickers / Arthur Lampkin
1962	Ipswich, Great Britain	(United Kingdom) Great Britain	Jeff Smith / Dave Bickers / Arthur Lampkin
1963	Loppem, Belgium	Sweden	Torsten Hallman / Lars Forsberg / Cenneth Lööf
1964	Markelo, Netherlands	Sweden	Torsten Hallman / Åke Jonsson / Olle Petersson
1965	Cancelled due to bad riding conditions		
1966	Brands Hatch, Great Britain	Sweden	Torsten Hallman / Åke Tornblom / Olle Petersson
1967	Holice, Czechoslovakia	Sweden	Torsten Hallman / Åke Jonsson / Olle Petersson
1968	Payerne, Switzerland	Sweden	Bengt Åberg / Christer Hammargren / Bengt-Arne Bonn
1969	Kester, Belgium	Belgium	Roger De Coster / Joël Robert / Sylvain Geboers
1970	Knutstorp, Sweden	Belgium	Roger De Coster / Joël Robert / Sylvain Geboers
1971	Holice, Czechoslovakia	Belgium	Roger De Coster / Sylvain Geboers / Jaak van Velthoven
1972	Genk, Belgium	Belgium	Roger De Coster / Joël Robert / Jaak van Velthoven / Marcel Wiertz
1973	Donington Park, Great Britain	Belgium	Roger De Coster / Sylvain Geboers / Jaak van Velthoven / Jean-Claude Laquaye
1974	Vesoul, France	Belgium	Roger De Coster / Gaston Rahier / Jaak van Velthoven / Harry Everts
1975	Maggiora, Italy	Belgium	Roger De Coster / Gaston Rahier / Jaak van Velthoven / Harry Everts
1976	Wohlen, Switzerland	Belgium	Roger De Coster / Gaston Rahier / Jaak van Velthoven / Harry Everts
1977	Markelo, Netherlands	Belgium	Roger De Coster / André Malherbe / Jaak van Velthoven / Harry Everts
1978	Kester, Belgium	Belgium	Roger De Coster / Gaston Rahier / Jaak van Velthoven / Harry Everts
1979	Stockholm, Sweden	Soviet Union	Guennady Moisseev / Vladimir Kavinov / Vladimir Korneev / Yuri Khudiakov
1980	Maggiora, Italy	Belgium	André Malherbe / Harry Everts / Georges Jobé / André Vromans
1981	Lommel, Belgium	United States	Chuck Sun / Danny LaPorte / Johnny O’Mara / Donnie Hansen
1982	Gaildorf, Germany	United States	David Bailey / Johnny O’Mara / Danny Chandler / Jim Gibson
1983	Považská Bystrica, Czechoslovakia	United States	David Bailey / Mark Barnett / Broc Glover / Jeff Ward
1984	Varberg, Sweden	United States	Broc Glover / Johnny O’Mara / Ricky Johnson / Jeff Ward
