= Philip Brodie =

Philip Brodie may refer to:

- Philip Brodie, Lord Brodie (born 1950), Scottish lawyer and judge
- Philip Brodie (actor) (born 1975), British actor and writer
