= Sue Fish =

American motorcycle racer (born 1958)

- Born: November 9, 1958 (age 67)
- Occupations: Motocross racer, stunt actor, actor, personal trainer
- Awards: Motorcycle Hall of Fame

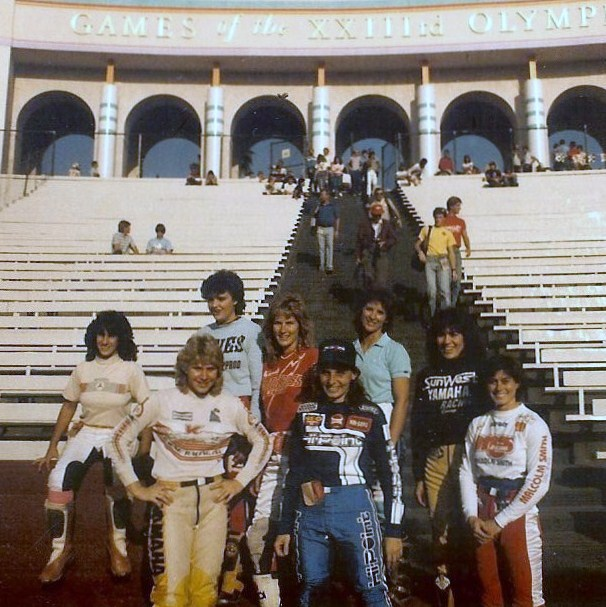

Sue "Flying" Fish (born November 9, 1958) is an American former motocross racer and stunt actor in the U.S. film industry.

Fish was a pioneering figure in American motorcycling, winning the 1976 and 1977 Women's National Motocross Championship. After a motocross injury, she took up downhill mountain biking, and won a silver medal at the 1994 UCI Downhill World Championships in Vail, Colorado. Fish was Linda Hamilton's stunt double in The Terminator.

Fish was inducted to the AMA Motorcycle Hall of Fame in 2012, and in 2013, she was named an FIM Legend for her pioneering motocross racing career. Semi-retired since 2009, she works as a personal trainer.

== See also ==
- List of Motorcycle Hall of Fame inductees
