= Delinquent (2016 American film) =

2016 American crime drama film

- Theatrical film poster
- Directed by: Kieran Valla
- Written by: Levi Smock; Kieran Valla
- Starring: Alex Shaffer; Bill Sage; Kim Director
- Cinematography: Daniel Marks
- Edited by: Vanara Taing
- Music by: Alex & Sam
- Release dates: June 5, 2016 (Brooklyn); July 31, 2018 (USA)
- Running time: 97 mins.
- Country: United States
- Language: English

Delinquent is a 2016 American crime drama independent film directed by Kieran Valla, who co-wrote with Levi Smock. The film star Alex Shaffer, Bill Sage, and Kim Director. It premiered at the Brooklyn Film Festival in 2016, before a limited theatrical release throughout the USA in 2018.

== Synopsis ==
Delinquent is the thrilling and dramatic exploration of a teenager's struggle to manage the fall-out of a robbery gone wrong.

== Cast ==
- Alex Shaffer as Joey
- Bill Sage as Rich
- Sam Dillon as Brendan
- Kevin Bigley as Britt
- David Fierro as Keegan
- Erin Darke as Tara
- Angela Pierce as Margy
- Matthew Shear as Mr. Simon
- Kim Director as Officer Reynolds
- Austin Zajur as Carter
- Sophie Tananbaum as Chrissy

== Production ==
The film was shot on location in Woodbury, Connecticut.

== Reception ==
Pamela Lowe-Saldana of All Things Thriller lauded the performances: "As Joey, Alex Shaffer, weaves a deft portrait of a streetwise teen who has lived beyond his years, but still embodies a youthful resilience that only naïveté can fuel. It is a brilliant performance." Jack Szabo of Cryptic Rock rated the film 4/5, praising the location: "Shot on location in Valla's hometown of Woodbury, Connecticut, [the film]'s creators relied on the backing of the townspeople and local law enforcement when funds were scarce. The result is an emotional, bleak story filled with flawed characters in a rural setting that felt genuine.
