= Runoff (2014 film) =

2014 film directed by Kimberly Levin

- Directed by: Kimberly Levin
- Written by: Kimberly Levin
- Starring: Joanne Kelly; Neal Huff; Alex Shaffer; Kivlighan de Montebello; Tom Bower; Darlene Hunt
- Production company: Reno Productions
- Distributed by: Monterey Media
- Release date: 2014
- Running time: 90 minutes
- Country: United States
- Language: English

Runoff is a 2014 drama film written and directed by Kimberly Levin that centers on Betty Freeman (Kelly) and her attempts to save her family after the government threatens to foreclose on her country estate. It premiered at the 2014 Los Angeles Film Festival. It had a limited theatrical release by Monterey Media on July 25, 2015.

== Cast ==
- Joanne Kelly – Betty
- Neal Huff – Frank
- Alex Shaffer – Finley
- Tom Bower – Scratch
- Kivlighan de Montebello – Sam
- Darlene Hunt – Paula

== Reception ==
On the review aggregator website Rotten Tomatoes, 79% of 19 critics' reviews are positive, with an average rating of 7.6/10. Metacritic, which uses a weighted average, assigned the film a score of 64 out of 100, based on 9 critics, indicating "generally favorable" reviews.

In his review on IndieWire, James Rocchi rated it a B− saying it is a Winter's Bone on a farm "with a sharp-eyed, almost documentary eye on the realities and everyday crimes of modern agribusiness". In Variety, Bill Edelstein said that director Kimberly Levin "gets naturalistic performances from all her actors, and tells her tale with a narrative economy that, despite the leisurely pace, never lingers too long in a scene".

== See also ==
- Surface runoff
