= Möklinta =

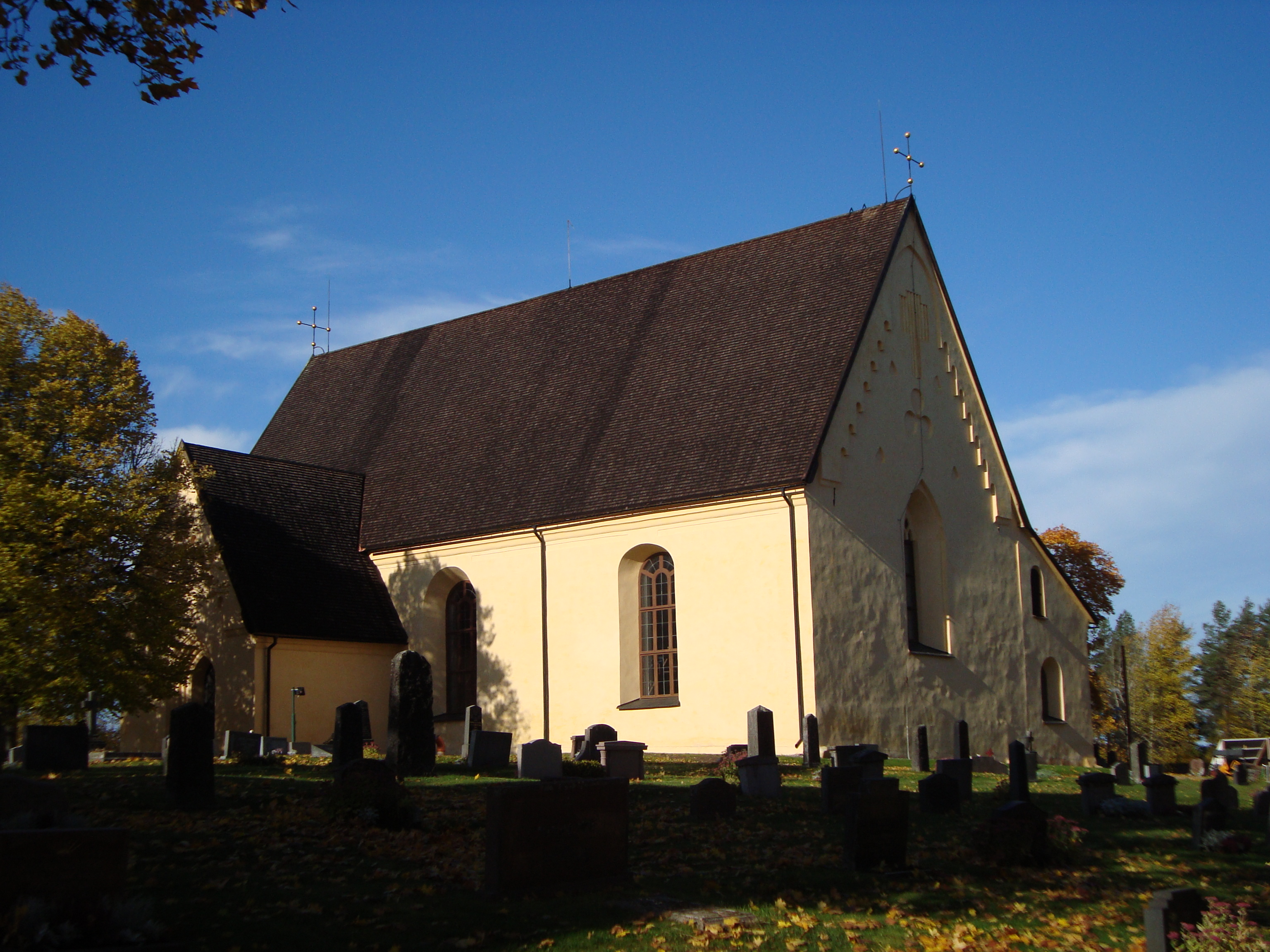
- Möklinta Church in October 2008

- Location within Västmanland Location within Sweden
- Coordinates: 60°04′N 16°32′E
- Country: Sweden
- Province: Västmanland
- County: Västmanland County
- Municipality: Sala Municipality

Area
  - Total: 0.99 km^{2} (0.38 sq mi)

Population (31 December 2010)
  - Total: 358
  - Density: 363/km^{2} (940/sq mi)
- Time zone: UTC+1 (CET)
  - Summer (DST): UTC+2 (CEST)

Möklinta is a locality situated in Sala Municipality, Västmanland County, Sweden with 358 inhabitants in 2010.
