= Mary McGee =

American motorcycle racer (1936–2024)

- Born: Mary Bernice Connor; December 12, 1936 Juneau, Alaska Territory, U.S.
- Died: November 27, 2024 (aged 87) Gardnerville, Nevada, U.S.

Motocross career
- Years active: 1957–1976

Mary Bernice McGee (née Connor; December 12, 1936 – November 27, 2024) was an American motorsport racing pioneer. She was the first woman to compete in motorcycle road racing and motocross events in the United States. Starting out as a sports car racer, she competed in motorcycle road racing and motocross from 1960 to 1976, then began competition again in 2000 in vintage motocross events. Her last race was in 2012. In 2013, McGee was named an FIM Legend for her pioneering motorcycle racing career. She was inducted into the AMA Motorcycle Hall of Fame in 2018.

== Early life ==
McGee was born in Juneau, Alaska Territory, on December 12, 1936. She then moved to Iowa to live with her grandparents during World War II, as Alaska was considered to be at risk of a Japanese invasion. In 1944 the family settled in Phoenix, Arizona. Eventually she met her husband, Don McGee, who was a mechanic who had worked on the east coast. Shortly after their 1956 wedding Don introduced her to racing cars which eventually led to racing motorcycles. While a tall 5 ft 11 in (1.80 m), Mary always described herself as "fast on my feet, fast with my brain, self-conscious and lacking confidence", however she had "no trouble with confidence on the race track".

== Sports car racing ==
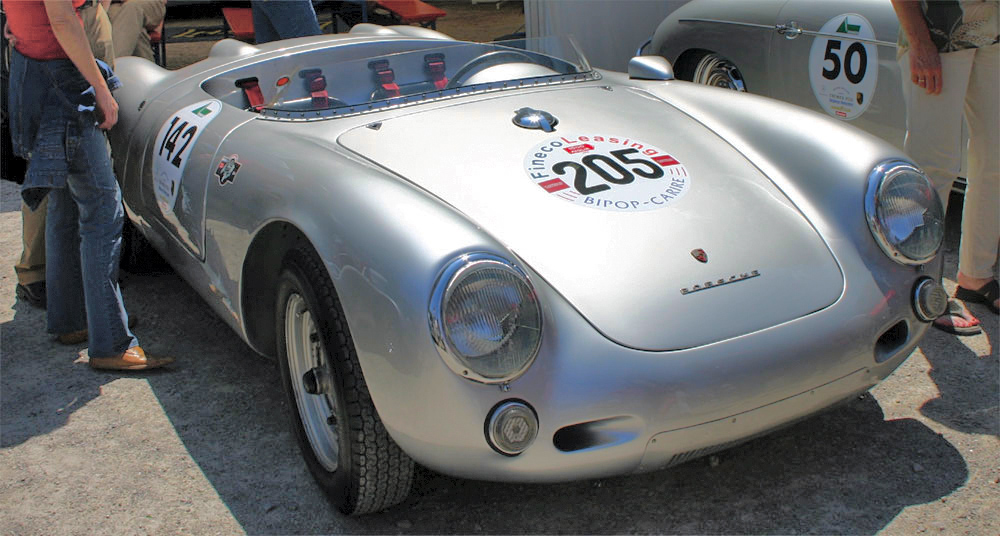
McGee raced a variety of cars, including the 550 Porsche Spyder

McGee began racing sports cars with the Sports Car Club of America in December 1957, driving a Mercedes 300SL owned by George Rice of Phoenix, Arizona. She consistently won her races, which earned her media attention. A January 1962 article in Motor Trend started with "Housewives revolt!" and ended with "so ladies if you are bored with freeway traffic, don’t give up. Buy a motorcycle and join Mary McGee." She continued racing sports cars until the summer of 1964.

McGee raced a variety of cars including:

- AC Bristol
- Ferrari Berlinetta
- Elva Mark IV
- Corvette
- Jaguar
- Lotus 18
- Porsche Spyder
- Ferrari Testa Rossa

Some of the tracks McGee raced on include:

- Riverside International Raceway, CA
- Hour Glass Field, CA
- Phoenix, AZ
- Tucson, AZ
- Santa Barbara, CA
- Palm Springs, CA
- Del Mar, CA
- Pomona, CA
- El Paso, TX
- Oakland, CA
- Dodger Stadium, Los Angeles, CA
- Cotati, CA
- Miramar, CA
- Mildland, TX
- Collidge, AZ
- Chandler, AZ
- Stockton, CA
- Vacaville, CA
- Salt Lake City, UT
- Reno, NV
- Hillclimb, Jerome, AZ

While McGee raced with the California Sports Car Club (Cal Club) and the Sports Car Club of America (SCCA), she placed:

- 1958 3rd over 1600cc class (Cal Club)
- 1959 3rd under 1600cc class (Cal Club)
- 1960 2nd E Modified class (Cal Club)
- 1961 1st over 1500cc Modified class (SCCA)
- 1962 2nd over 1500cc Modified class (SCCA)
- 1963 2nd in Pacific Coast Championship
- 1964 2nd in Pacific Coast Championship

== Motorcycle road racing ==
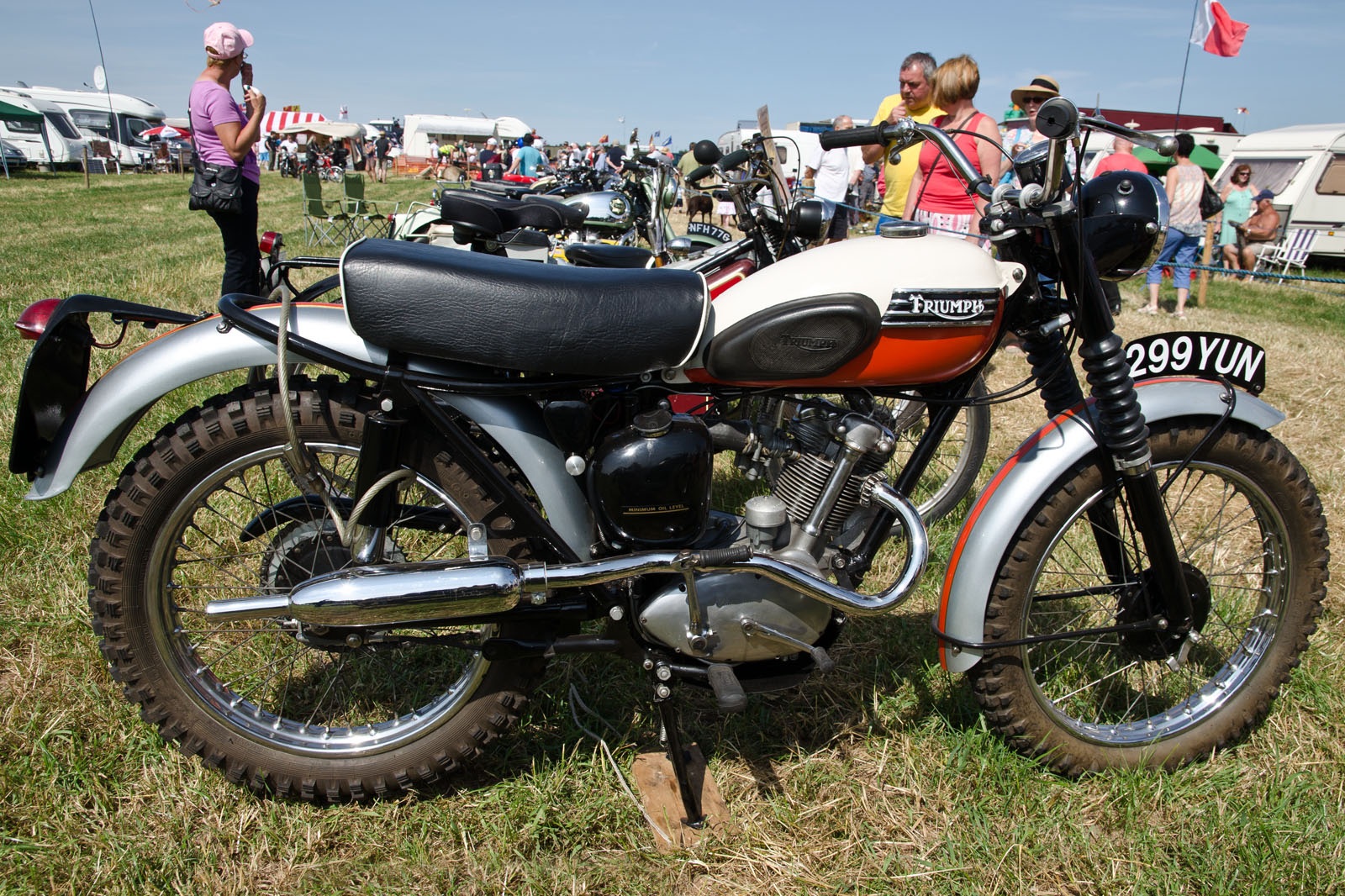
McGee learned to ride on a Triumph Tiger Cub in 1957. Pictured here is the 1960 version

McGee bought her first motorcycle in 1957, when a friend needed to sell a 200cc 1956 Triumph Tiger Cub. She knew nothing about motorcycles at that time but was willing to learn and ended up falling in love with the sport. The Tiger Cub didn't always start, so she traded it for a Honda C110 that she used to commute to her job as a parts manager at Flint British Motors. In 1960, while she was racing a Porsche Spyder in Santa Barbara, California, the car's owner, Czech race-car icon Vasek Polak, suggested to McGee's husband that she should ride a motorcycle to improve her car-racing skills. When he told her, McGee responded with, "Okay. Why not?"

A female road racer in the United States was a new phenomenon. McGee was already known to be an expert car racer, but the American Federation of Motorcyclists (AFM) wanted to be sure she could also perform on two wheels, so they told her she'd first have to attend a try-out. She passed the audition and became the first woman to road race and hold a FIM license in the United States – on a 125 Honda CB92 wearing her pink polka-dot helmet. She raced motorcycles from 1960 to 1963. Wes Cooley Sr. was President of AFM during this time. In 1962 , McGee had earned enough points in all classes to run the #20 AFM number plate on her bike in 1963. She stopped road racing motorcycles in the fall of 1963 when there were coming rule changes for women even though at that point she was the only woman racing; however, these rules did not end up going into effect.

Some of the tracks that McGee raced on include:

- Riverside International Raceway, CA
- San Luis Obispo, CA
- Stockton, CA (old port and empty warehouses)
- Las Vegas, NV (city streets where the Convention Centre now stands)
- Hanford, CA (only banked track)
- Willows Spring, CA (Including the US MC/FIM sanctioned GP Race in 1961. Mike Hailwood and Paddy Driver (UK) also raced.)
- Laguna Seca Raceway, CA (1962 – Was the first time motorcycles were allowed)
- Santa Barbara, CA
- Santa Rosa, CA
- Vacaville, CA
- Reno, NV (At registration, Mary was told she was not allowed to race a motorcycle or a car because no woman had ever raced there before)

== Dirt bike racing ==
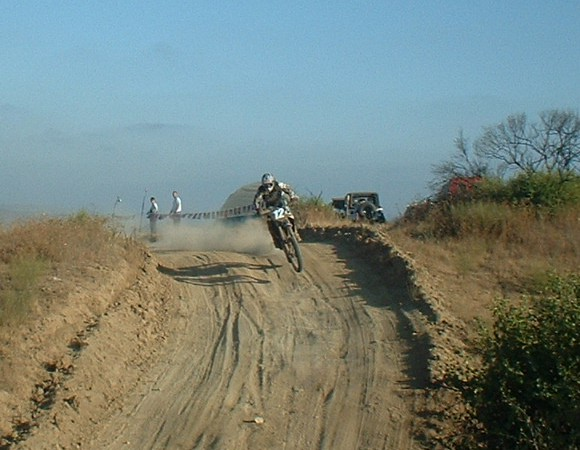
McGee rode the Baja 500 solo in 1975

In 1963 at a New Year's Eve party attended by Hollywood stars who raced both cars and motorcycles, McGee's friend actor Steve McQueen told her "McGee, you’ve got to get off that pansy road-racing bike and come out to the desert." Car racer and stunt man Bobby Harris was McGee's mentor. Her rite of passage came several months later in 1963 when Harris and other celebrity racers convinced her to enter a desert race, an AMA District 37 Enduro in Jawbone Canyon, California. McGee rode with Bob Drake, Bobby Harris & Al Tinker. The men all rode 650cc Triumphs while Mary rode a 1962 CL72 250cc Honda Scrambler. The men promised McGee that the event would be easy, but she recalls it being anything but as she was exhausted and cold in the snow that fell.

In 1966, McGee purchased a 250cc CZ and raced it through 1967 when she started racing Husqvarna motorcycles. In 1967, she started desert racing in Baja California events. McGee's career highlight racing bikes in Baja was in 1975, when she rode a 250 Husqvarna solo in the Baja 500, passing 17 two-man teams. McGee says that the hardest thing she ever did was Baja. "It was very barren, no electricity, no doctors, no phone. I carried Percodan in case of injury because you’d have to ride injured to get to someplace where someone has a car to get to Ensenada or La Paz to a clinic or back to the States. Luckily, I never had to use the Percodan, but I did come off the bike several times." McGee ended her motocross and long distance dirt racing around 1976 for nearly 30 years. In 2000, after moving to Northern Nevada and meeting old motorcycle friends, she bought a 1974 250cc Husqvarna and started entering the women's class in vintage motocross events. McGee started off in the over 60 class then moved on to the over 70 class a few years later.

== Personal life and death ==
In 1956, Mary married Don McGee; the couple later divorced in 1976.

In 1964, McGee's brother, Jim, died in a car race in Vacaville, California. That same year, McGee was also involved in a serious auto accident in New York. While she was in the hospital receiving treatment for injuries sustained in the accident, she discovered she was pregnant.

In 1965, McGee gave birth to a son.

McGee lived near Carson City, Nevada, and also had a granddaughter.

McGee died from complications of a stroke in Gardnerville, Nevada, on November 27, 2024, at the age of 87. Her death occurred just one day before the release of the documentary Motorcycle Mary, which was released on ESPN's YouTube channel.

== Achievements ==
- Past Pacific Coast Champion Sports Car Club of America Sports and Formula Cars
- First woman to race in a US MC/FIM sanctioned motorcycle race in the US (1960)
- First woman to finish the Baja 1000 (1968)
- First woman to Road Race motorcycles in the US
- First woman to race Motocross in the US
- First woman to compete with Europeans in International motocross in the US
- First person and only woman to ride the Baja 500 solo (1975)
- AMA Motorcycle Hall of Fame inductee (2018)
- Off-Road Motorsports Hall of Fame inductee (2023)

In August 2012, the AMA International Women & Motorcycling Conference asked McGee to be the guest speaker. On December 2, 2012, McGee was given the distinguished honor of being the FIM Woman Legend of 2012 at the FIM Gala in Monte Carlo, Monaco. This was McGee's first trip to Europe.

On April 5, 2014, McGee was inducted into the Trailblazers Hall of Fame. Trailblazers was founded in 1936 by motorcycle enthusiasts in California and has held banquets every year since 1940. In 2015 McGee was the recipient of the 2015 Extreme Sports Award. At the Finals in the Desert, put on by the American Vintage Dirt Racers Association (AVDRA) at the MC Motorsports Park in Tucson, AZ on November 13, 2016, in McGee's honor, AVDRA awarded the highest point rider in any class with the McGee Cup, recognizing McGee's many accomplishments over the years.

== Filmography ==
A short documentary film about McGee's life and career, titled Motorcycle Mary, premiered at the Tribeca Film Festival in New York on June 7, 2024. The film was directed by Haley Watson and executive produced by Formula One world champion Lewis Hamilton and Oscar winner Ben Proudfoot. It received a nomination for 'Outstanding Short Documentary' at the 46th Annual News & Documentary Emmy Awards.

== See also ==
- List of Motorcycle Hall of Fame inductees
- Female motorcycle racers
