= Kasper Jensen =

Danish footballer (born 1982)

Personal information
- Date of birth: 7 October 1982 (age 44)
- Place of birth: Aalborg, Denmark
- Height: 1.93 m (6 ft 4 in)
- Position: Goalkeeper

Youth career
- 1987–1995: Gug
- 1995–2002: AaB

Senior career*
Years	Team	Apps	(Gls)
2003–2004	Jetsmark	20	(0)
2004–2005	SønderjyskE	2	(0)
2005–2007	Werder Bremen II	68	(0)
2005–2007	Werder Bremen	0	(0)
2007–2008	Carl Zeiss Jena	6	(0)
2008–2010	SC Paderborn	45	(0)
2010–2011	FC Midtjylland	12	(0)
2012	Djurgården IF	5	(0)
2013	Vejle-Kolding	11	(0)
2013–2015	Silkeborg IF	43	(0)
Total		213	(0)

International career
1997–1998	Denmark U16	2	(0)
2000	Denmark U17	1	(0)
2002	Denmark U19	1	(0)
- * Club domestic league appearances and goals

Kasper Jensen (born 7 October 1982) is a Danish former professional footballer who played as a goalkeeper.

== International career ==
Jensen is former youth international player and played for the U16, U17 and U19 in four matches.
