= Women in the Wind (motorcycle club) =

- Abbreviation: WITW
- Founded: 1 June 1979
- Founder: Becky Brown
- Founded at: Toledo, Ohio
- Region served: Australia, Canada, Cyprus, Nepal, New Zealand, Nicaragua, UK, US,
- Members: 140 chapters
- President: Cat Grabowski
- Key people: Becky Brown, Cris Simmons, Jo Giovannoni, Elyse White, Debbie Bearup
- Website: womeninthewind.org

Women in the Wind is an international, all female motorcycle club founded in 1979 by AMA Motorcycle Hall of Fame inductee Becky Brown.

The organization seeks to unite women motorcyclists, promote a positive image of women and motorcycling and educate its members on motorcycle safety and maintenance. It has 140 chapters across 4 continents, and is the largest women's motorcycle organization of its kind.

Founder Becky Brown's bike was on permanent display at the National Motorcycle Museum in Anamosa, Iowa from April 2015 until September 2023, when the museum closed.

== Filmography ==
Behind Closed Doors: Women in the Wind. Hamilton, Karen, BBC TV (1998)
