= Danny Chandler =

American motorcycle racer

- Nationality: American
- Born: October 5, 1959 Sacramento, California, U.S.
- Died: 4 May 2010 (aged 50) Yuba City, California, U.S.

Motocross career
- Years active: 1979 - 1985
- Teams: Maico, Honda [KTM]
- Wins: 4

Danny "Magoo" Chandler (October 5, 1959 – May 4, 2010) was an American professional motocross racer. He competed in the AMA Motocross Championships from 1979 to 1985. He is remembered for his hard-charging, aggressive riding style.

Chandler began his professional motocross career with the Maico factory racing team in 1979. He was nicknamed Magoo by his father at an early age, and the name stuck. By 1982, he had earned a place in the American Honda factory racing team. That same year he beat the vaunted Europeans at the 500cc U.S. Motocross Gran Prix at perhaps the toughest motocross tracks in the United States, Carlsbad. The victory would be the biggest of his career. In 1982, he also won both races in the Motocross des Nations as well as the Trophée des Nations, becoming the first rider to win both motos of both events in the same year.

After being dropped from the Honda team, Chandler went to Europe to compete in the Motocross World Championships. His career ended when he was left paralyzed after a crash at a supercross race in Paris in 1986. Despite the setback, Chandler began promoting mountain bike races and became involved with D.A.R.E. Chandler was inducted into the American Motorcyclist Association Motorcycle Hall of Fame in 1999.

Chandler died on May 4, 2010, from illnesses related to his paralysis.
