= Orie Steele =

American motorcycle racer

Orie Steele (March 20, 1887 – 1960) was an American motorcycle hillclimb national champion in the 1920s and 1930s. Steele was born in Paterson, New Jersey.

Steele's career began in 1913 riding endurance races. He raced for Indian Motocycle Company. His father John Steele owned an Indian Motocycle dealership in Paterson, New Jersey. After early success in endurance racing, including winning the 500 mile 1914 Yonkers Endurance Run, he stopped racing during World War One. At this time, he worked with the Army outfitting motorcycles and training men how to ride them. After the war's end, he returned to competition and began winning races all over the country, primarily in motorcycle hillclimbs, and was prominently featured in Indian's advertising.

Steele was inducted into the Motorcycle Hall of Fame in October 2007.
