= Alex Shaffer (actor) =

American actor (born 1993)

- Born: August 23, 1993 (age 33); Hunterdon County, New Jersey
- Occupation: Actor
- Years active: 2010–present

Alex Shaffer (born August 23, 1993) is an American actor, best known for his role as Kyle Timmons, a troubled kid and a wrestling prodigy, in the 2011 film Win Win.

== Life and career ==
Shaffer was born in Hunterdon County, New Jersey and raised in Raritan Township. He was a sophomore at Hunterdon Central Regional High School when he was cast as a young wrestler in the movie Win Win after a classmate tipped him off about the auditions to the film that required an athlete-wrestler. Shaffer had been a successful high school wrestler, winning the 2010 New Jersey State Wrestling Championship at 119 lb. as a sophomore, but his wrestling career ended when he broke his L-5 vertebra.

Shaffer's screen debut earned raves. Roger Ebert described his acting as "effortlessly convincing." Shaffer, whose hair was bleached for the role, "plays the reserved and withdrawn Kyle to perfection," said film critic Brandon Fibbs. As for the film director Tom McCarthy, he said: "I knew that if the kid we cast had never wrestled, he wasn’t going to be able to fake it, at least not at the level we wanted Kyle to be. The great thing about Alex is, he also evokes all the qualities of a 16-year-old kid. He just felt so real to me. We really put him through the wringer on this movie and he just kept getting better and better." In an interview with PBS he said: "You know, this monosyllabic shut-down character we all know and love so much, which is very difficult to bring to the screen actually, as you run the risk of the character being flat, but he [Alex Shaffer] found a way in his directness to be very charming".

After the success of Win Win, Shaffer decided to pursue acting professionally. In 2013 he starred alongside Kristen Bell and Martin Starr in the Sundance indie The Lifeguard. He also stars in the director/writer Kimberly Levin's independent film, Runoff. He played the character Squirrel in the 2015 film We Are Your Friends, starring Zac Efron and directed by Max Joseph. At the same time, he briefly filled in as a guest host on the MTV series Catfish: The TV Show in place of Joseph.

In 2016 Shaffer played the role of board track and dirt track racer Albert "Shrimp" Burns in the Discovery Channel docudrama Harley and the Davidsons.

== Filmography ==
- 2011: Win Win as Kyle Timmons
- 2013: The Lifeguard as Matt
- 2014: Runoff
- 2015: Catfish: The TV Show
- 2015: We Are Your Friends as Squirrel
- 2016: Youth in Oregon as Nick Gleason
- 2016: Delinquent as "Joey"
- 2016: Harley and the Davidsons as Albert "Shrimp" Burns
- 2018: The Griddle House as "Jack"
- 2019 Ring Ring
