= Albert Burns (motorcyclist) =

American motorcycle racer

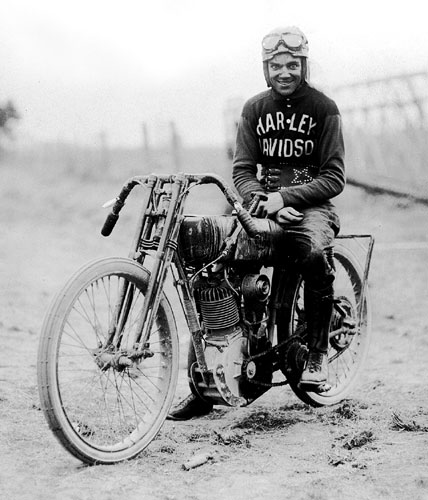
- Born: August 12, 1898; Oakdale, California
- Died: August 14, 1921 (aged 23); Toledo, Ohio
- Nickname: "Shrimp"
- Nationality: United States

Career history
- 1913-1918: Independent
- 1919: Harley-Davidson
- 1920-1921: Indian

Individual honours
- 1919: 100-mile national championship

Albert William "Shrimp" Burns (August 12, 1898, Oakdale, California – August 14, 1921, Toledo, Ohio) was an American dirt and board track motorcycle racer in the early 20th century. Riding for Harley-Davidson and later Indian, he won multiple races in California and later the east coast and the midwest. He won the national championship in 1919, and was inducted in the AMA Motorcycle Hall of Fame in 1998.

== Early life and start in racing ==
Burns grew up in Oakdale, California, and it was there that he first discovered motorcycles. The young Burns hung out at the local Pope motorcycle dealership, and was hired as a shop helper when he was 12. Later he was allowed to run messages for the shop and occasionally borrowed a machine to ride on his own time.[2]

Burns's first professional motorcycle race was in Sacramento on May 4, 1913. He finished fourth. Burns improved his racing skills through the summer of 1913 on the tracks of Northern California. The other racers didn't like being upstaged by a 15-year-old riding inferior equipment, and for a time Burns was prevented from competing, but by the end of the season, Burns earned his first victory in San Jose.

On July 4, 1915, Burns won three events at Pleasanton, California, including a 100-mile race.

Burns was noted for his toughness. In a Marysville, California, race, Burns suffered a hard fall, but managed to put his machine back together in time for the next race and won the five-mile final. Later it was found that he had ridden with a fractured collarbone and broken shoulder.

After a temporary halt to his career due to World War I, early in 1919, Burns won one of the first major West Coast races after the war in Fresno, California. In June of that year, the 20-year-old Burns signed his first factory contract, with Harley-Davidson.

== Career ==
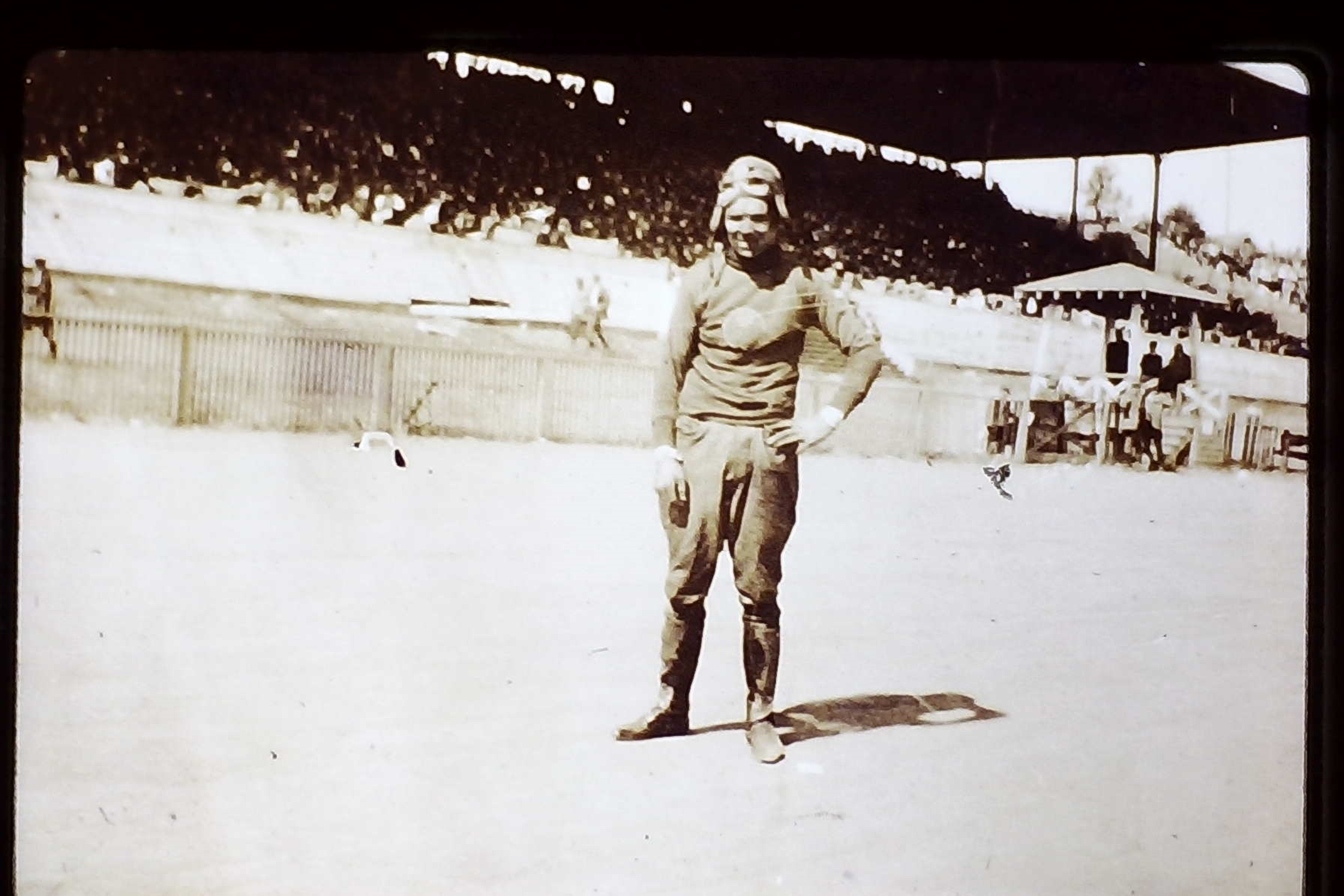
Shrimp Burns at Rose City, courtesy of the American Motorcyclist Association Archives

=== 1919 ===
Now able to race outside his native California, Burns won a five-mile solo race as well as a sidecar event on July 4, 1919, in Baltimore, Maryland. Burns won many races throughout the Midwest that summer, and earned the 100-mile national championship by edging out Ralph Hepburn by inches in the final major race of the 1919 season on the board track at Sheepshead Bay, New York.

=== 1920 ===
Burns signed with Indian for the 1920 season, an unusual act due to the intense rivalry between the two manufacturers. Burns had felt overshadowed by the more established racers at Harley-Davidson, and Indian had promised him the best equipment. Burns also clashed with Otto Walker, the Harley-Davidson team captain.

Burns delivered for Indian immediately, winning the first national title of the 1920 season in the 25-mile national at Ascot Park in Los Angeles. Mechanical failures plagued Burns throughout the 1920 season, preventing him from expected victories in the national races at Dodge City, Kansas, and Marion, Indiana. Burns did win the five-mile solo championship race in Denver in September of that year.

=== 1921 ===
In his first race of the 1921 season, Burns achieved a remarkable win on the new 1.25-mile board track in Beverly Hills, California, after sustaining heavy injuries. Burns won the first race of the day, but crashed in the next race, severely injuring his hands and arms with large splinters from the wood track. Burns returned for the last race of the day, riding a borrowed machine and with his arms completely bandaged. Burns rode mid-pack through most of the race, but on the last lap he went high on the final turn and sped down the steep banking to win the race.

== Death ==
Burns died in a racing accident on August 14, 1921, in Toledo, Ohio. Burns ran into the back of Ray Weishaar's bike while coming out of a turn and crashed into the railing. He later died of massive head injuries. Burns's fiancée, Genevieve Moritz, had come to Toledo to deliver a birthday gift and witnessed the fatal accident.
