= Ray Weishaar =

American motorcycle racer

Lawrence Ray Weishaar

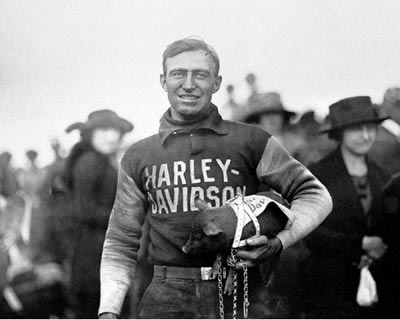
Weishaar holding the team's mascot

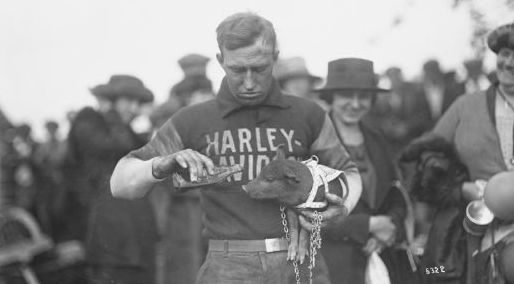
Weishaar feeding soda to the team pig

Lawrence Ray Weishaar (September 9, 1890 – April 13, 1924) was a Class A Racing Champion in the 1910s and 1920s. He rode for the Harley-Davidson 'Wrecking Crew,' and helped to popularize the nickname 'hog' in reference to Harley-Davidson by carrying the team's mascot, a small pig, around on victory laps.

== Early life ==
Lawrence Ray Weishaar was born on September 9, 1890, in Oklahoma; he grew up in Wichita, Kansas. His father died when he was only nine years old, leaving him and his mother with little to live on. Weishaar sought work to help support his family, and as a teenager he got a job with Bell Telephone. He eventually saved up enough money to buy himself a motorcycle which was, at the time, the most cost-effective form of transportation.

== Career ==
Weishaar began racing the half-mile circuits of various county fairs around Kansas between 1908 and 1910. He earned the nickname "Kansas Cyclone," and subsequently won the Kansas State Championship two years in a row. The second time around on the championship race, one of the handlebars on his motorcycle broke off, yet he still won the race (but he did not break his previous record).

Weishaar was racing on the national circuit by 1914, with the national event in Savannah, Georgia being his first big race. He was forced to drop out of the race on the 24th lap when his gas tank began leaking; at the time he was vying for the first-place position. In 1915, at the Dodge City 300, a malfunctioning spark plug caused him to lose, and he also lost a 300-mile race at the Chicago Speedway due to his helmet strap coming loose, but that same year he claimed a victory in a 100-mile race in Pratt, Kansas. The following article appeared in the September 1915 issue of The Harley-Davidson Dealer:

Ray Weishaar Hung on to his Helmet Four Laps With his Teeth

(Chicago Speedway, September 12, 1915) "In the 13th lap, however, his helmet became unfastened, Weishaar hung on to the strings with his teeth for four laps and then threw the helmet into the pits.

Chairman John L. Donovan of the F.A.M. copetition [sic] committee and Referee Frank E. Yates saw the helmet go into the pits and insisted on knowing to whom it beloged [sic]. There was considerable dispute for several laps as a result of their determination to make Weishaar stop and put on his helmet again.

As Weishaar came around each lap in the lead, those of us who were in the pits did out best to argue the officials out of their idea of forcing Weishaar to make an extra stop but they were determined in their course and as a result we had to call Weishaar into the pits in the 27th lap. This undoubtedly cost Weishaar the race." (The Harley-Davidson Dealer September 1915)

Weishaar was made a part of the Harley-Davidson factory team in 1916. That year, he came in third place at Dodge City, and he won the FAM 100-Mile Championship in Detroit. He became a dealer of Harley-Davidson motorcycles for three years after being given a dealership, but he returned to racing in 1919.

Weishaar's greatest victory was in Indiana, in the Marion Cornfield Classic Road Race, which took place in 1920. He won the race, as well as beating the standing race record by 18 minutes.

The Harley-Davidson team's mascot was a small pig, which they would take around the track with them on victory laps. Weishaar was particularly fond of it, and many photographs exist of him and the pig. It is because of this mascot that Harley-Davidson motorcycles are called "hogs."

Weishaar had a reputation as a cautious rider who often succumbed to the forces of bad luck. Many times he would be leading national events only to be forced to drop out to equipment malfunction. In 1923 he moved to Los Angeles after signing a contract to race at the newly built Legion Ascot Speedway Speedway.

== Death ==
On April 13, 1924, Weishaar was battling Gene Walker (who rode for the Indian factory). Johnny Seymour had drafted past both Walker and Weishaar, which sent Weishaar's motorcycle into a high-speed wobble. The motorcycle went into a skid; Weishaar fought to save it, but before he could do so he hit the outside fence. Weishaar went through the wooden fence and wrecked. He was still conscious and no one thought him to be seriously injured. His wife, Emma, drove him to the Los Angeles General Hospital, where he died in a matter of hours from his internal injuries. He was 33 years old.

== Response from the racing industry ==
Weishaar's death, along with the death of Gene Walker two months later, caused the motorcycle racing industry to slow down the speeds of the bikes at the time. Smaller engine classes were created, but as with most racing sports the speeds began to climb again.

== Recognition ==
Weishaar was inducted into the Motorcycle Hall of Fame in 1998.
