= Win Win (film) =

2011 film by Tom McCarthy

- Theatrical release poster
- Directed by: Tom McCarthy
- Screenplay by: Tom McCarthy
- Story by: Tom McCarthy; Joe Tiboni
- Produced by: Mary Jane Skalski; Michael London; Lisa Maria Falcone; Tom McCarthy
- Starring: Paul Giamatti; Amy Ryan; Bobby Cannavale; Jeffrey Tambor
- Cinematography: Oliver Bokelberg
- Edited by: Tom McArdle
- Music by: Lyle Workman
- Production companies: Everest Entertainment; Groundswell Productions; Next Wednesday Productions
- Distributed by: Fox Searchlight Pictures
- Release dates: January 21, 2011 (Sundance); March 18, 2011 (United States)
- Running time: 106 minutes
- Country: United States
- Language: English
- Budget: $5 million
- Box office: $11.8 million

Win Win is a 2011 American sports comedy-drama film written, directed, and co-produced by Tom McCarthy from a story by McCarthy and Joe Tiboni. It stars Paul Giamatti as a struggling attorney who, volunteering as a high-school wrestling coach, takes on the guardianship of an elderly client in a desperate attempt to keep his practice afloat. Alex Shaffer, Amy Ryan, Bobby Cannavale, and Jeffrey Tambor appear in supporting roles.

The film had its world premiere at the Sundance Film Festival on January 21, 2011, and was theatrically released in the United States on March 18, 2011, by Fox Searchlight Pictures. It grossed over $11.8 million worldwide against a $5 million budget, and received positive reviews from critics, who mostly praised McCarthy's screenplay and the performances of the cast. It was named one of the top 10 independent films of 2011 by the National Board of Review, while McCarthy and Tiboni were nominated for Best Original Screenplay at the 17th Critics' Choice Awards and for Best Screenplay at the 27th Independent Spirit Awards.

== Plot ==
Small-town New Providence, New Jersey, attorney Mike Flaherty moonlights as a wrestling coach and struggles to keep his practice solvent, while shielding his wife Jackie and their two young girls, Abby and Stella, from the extent of the problem. When his court-appointed client, Leo Poplar, who is suffering from early dementia, turns out to have no locatable relatives, he persuades a judge to appoint him as guardian, for which he will receive a stipend of $1,508 per month. Mike, however, has no intention of taking care of Leo and moves him to a senior care facility while he continues to get paid for guardianship.

When Leo's teenage grandson, Kyle, shows up from Columbus, Ohio, looking to live with him, Mike and Jackie let him stay with them instead. Kyle tries to break into Leo's old house, and when Mike and Jackie question him about it, he reveals his troubled family life: His mom is in rehab, she lives with her boyfriend, and he does not want to go back. Upon hearing this, Jackie refuses to allow Kyle to return home and lets him stay in their household. After Kyle sits in on practice, they discover that he is a talented wrestler and enroll him at Mike's high school, where he can resume his education and wrestle on Mike's losing team, helping to make them viable contenders in their league.

This "everyone benefits" setup is disrupted when Kyle's mother Cindy shows up, fresh out of rehab. Cindy attempts to gain custody of her father and her son, and with them her father's substantial estate. However, Mike explains to Cindy and her lawyer that Leo had disinherited her from his will, causing her to become furious. Later, Cindy calls Kyle to her hotel room to show him court documents proving that Mike has been taking advantage of his arrangement with Leo. Kyle reacts violently towards his mother before running away.

Upon learning the truth about Mike, the boy rejects him as a money-seeking opportunist no better than his mother. Realizing the mistake of his earlier actions, and seeking instead to do what is best for both Leo and Kyle, Mike offers Cindy the monthly stipend in exchange for leaving them in his care. He and Jackie take Kyle into their home permanently and return Leo to his, with Mike instead taking a job as a bartender to address his financial problems.

== Cast ==
- Paul Giamatti as Mike Flaherty
- Alex Shaffer as Kyle Timmons
- Amy Ryan as Jackie Flaherty
- Bobby Cannavale as Terry Delfino
- Jeffrey Tambor as Stephen Vigman
- Burt Young as Leo Poplar
- Melanie Lynskey as Cindy Timmons
- Margo Martindale as Eleanor Cohen
- David W. Thompson as Stemler
- Mike Diliello as Jimmy Reed
- Nina Arianda as Shelly
- Marcia Haufrecht as Gina Flaherty
- Sharon Wilkins as Judge Lee
- Clare Foley as Abby
- Tim Ransom as Stuart

== Reception ==
=== Box office ===
Win Win grossed $10.1 million in the United States and Canada, and $1.7 million in other territories, for a worldwide total of $11.8 million.

=== Critical response ===
On the review aggregator website Rotten Tomatoes, 95% of 175 critics' reviews are positive, with an average rating of 7.8/10. The website's consensus reads: "Rich, wonderful characters and strong performances populate Win Win, with writer/director Thomas McCarthy continuing to emerge as a great American humanist." Metacritic, which uses a weighted average, assigned the film a score of 75 out of 100, based on 34 critics, indicating "generally favorable" reviews.

A. O. Scott of The New York Times felt the film was "funny and warmhearted" and wrote, "Win Win does not leave that cozy realm, but it finds enough to work with there. It is in no way challenging or provocative, but it is never dull or obvious. It's a good movie about trying to be good." Kenneth Turan of the Los Angeles Times called it "McCarthy's most polished and successful film to date, as well as a bit of a risk" and lauded Giamatti's performance, stating that he "has always had a gift for creating intense empathy for sketchy characters, an ability that has never been more essential than it is here." Peter Travers of Rolling Stone gave the film 3.5 stars out of 4, describing the film as a "gem, hilarious and heartfelt with a tough core that repels all things sappy" and "just about perfect." Roger Ebert of the Chicago Sun-Times gave it 3 out of 4 stars, writing "You have a funny situation, and there's some truth in it and unexpected characters, well-acted, and you may not have a great film but you enjoy watching it." Steven Rea of The Philadelphia Inquirer gave it 3 out of 4 stars, writing "[Giamatti] delivers a marvel of a performance—all the more so because we forget that he is performing." He concluded "Win Win doesn't quite hit the high notes of grace and revelation that The Station Agent and The Visitor achieved, but McCarthy and his able cast pull off a similar mix of humor and pathos, smiles and angst." Ty Burr of The Boston Globe wrote "Win Win is the most radical movie yet from writer-director Tom McCarthy, and it may be one of the more daring movies to be recently released in America."

== Soundtrack ==
Brooklyn-based indie rock band The National contributed an original song to the movie's soundtrack. The song is titled "Think You Can Wait" and features vocals from fellow Brooklyn musician Sharon Van Etten.
