= Gene Walker =

American motorcycle racer

Eugene (Gene) Walker
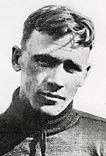
- Born: 7 June 1893; Birmingham, Alabama
- Died: 21 June 1924 (aged 31); Stroudsburg, Pennsylvania
- Occupation: Motorcyclist
- Children: 2

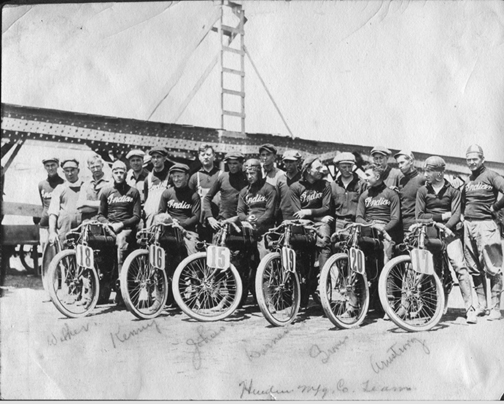
1914 Indian team: 18, Gene Walker; 16, Dave Kinney; 15, Don Johns; 19, Specs Warner; 20, Marty Graves; 17, Red Armstrong

Gene Walker (June 7, 1893 – June 21, 1924) was an American motorcycle flat track racer who was one of the first riders from the Southern United States to become nationally known, winning 19 championships in a ten-year career that ended with his death at the peak of his success.

In 1910, Walker obtained his first motorcycle, an Excelsior. At the age of 17, he worked as a postal delivery person in Birmingham using an Indian motorcycle for delivering mail. Walker entered his first motorcycle race at the 1912 Alabama State Fair and won the five-mile final. In the same year, he left his job at the post office to go to work for a Birmingham Indian dealer named Bob Stubbs.

In 1914, Walker turned professional and worked in the testing room at the Indian headquarters in Springfield, Massachusetts. Walker won 19 national championships in his 10 years of professional racing before he died in 1924. On June 7, while practicing alone on a track in Stroudsburg, Pennsylvania, Walker crashed. He died in Rosenkrans Hospital in East Stroudsburg, Pennsylvania, on June 21.

Walker was inducted to the Motorcycle Hall of Fame in 1998.

== Major milestones ==
Year	Location	Achievement
1915, July 10	FAM meeting Saratoga, New York	1st Five Mile Championship and new record
1919	USA	Won 6 out of 13 national championship races and set 3 track records
1920, April 14	Daytona Beach, Florida	Set new motorcycle world speed record
1920	USA	Named Champion of Champions by Motorcycle and Bicycle Illustrated
1924, February 17	Los Angeles, California	1st Five Mile Championship
