= Glen Echo Park (Maryland) =

- Glen Echo Park Historic District
- U.S. National Register of Historic Places
- U.S. Historic district
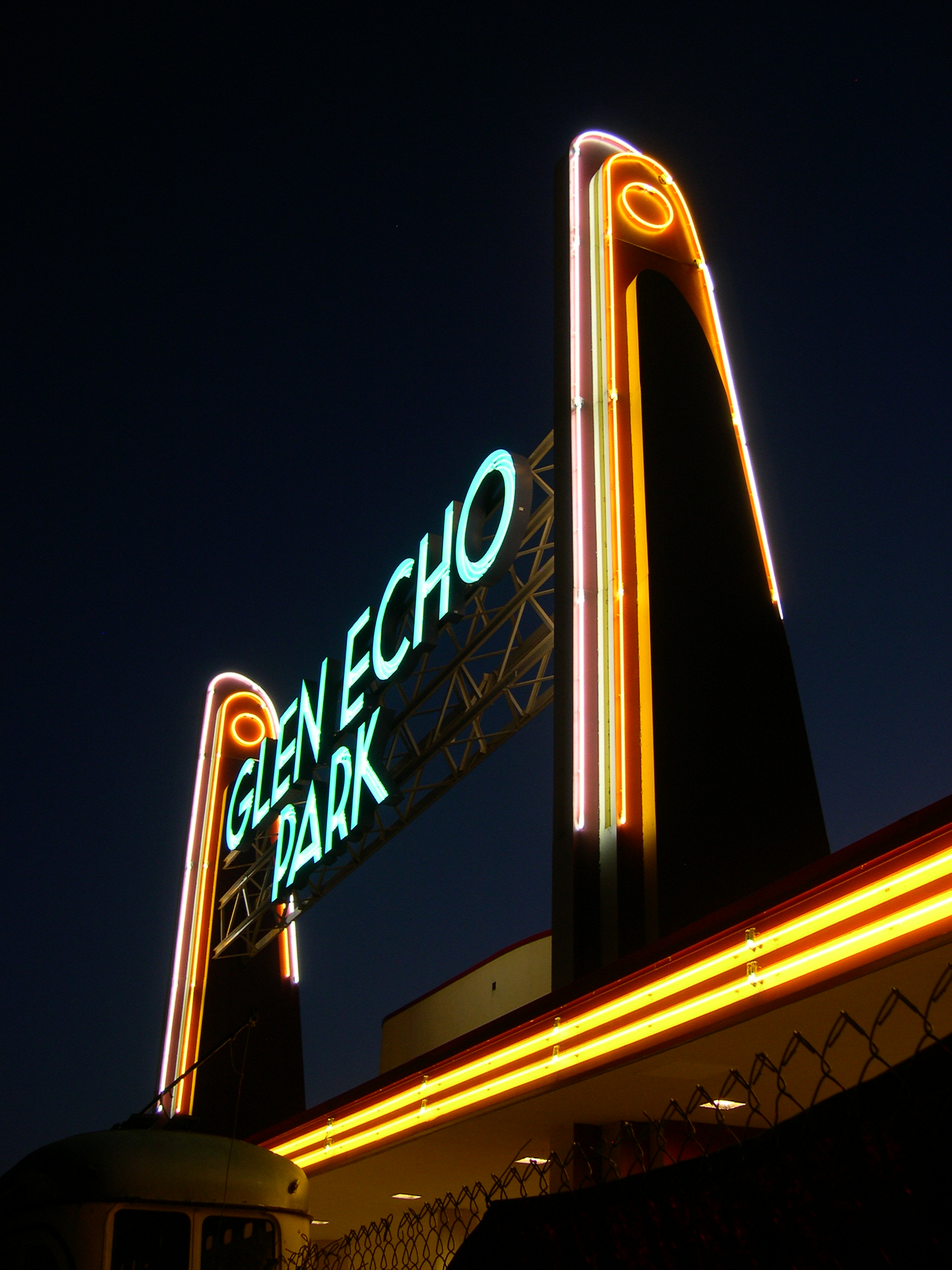

- Location within Maryland Location within the United States
- Location: 7300 MacArthur Blvd. Glen Echo, Maryland
- Coordinates: 38°57′58″N 77°08′19″W
- Area: 9 acres (3.6 ha)
- Built: 1891
- Architect: Multiple
- Architectural style: Moderne, Queen Anne, Shingle Style, Spanish Colonial Mission Revival
- NRHP reference No.: 84001850
- Added to NRHP: June 8, 1984

Glen Echo Park is an arts and cultural center in Glen Echo, Maryland, a suburb of Washington, D.C. Located about 9 miles (14 km) northwest of the city's downtown area, the park's site was initially developed in 1891 as a National Chautauqua Assembly.

After the foreclosure and sale of the Chautauqua grounds in 1903, leisure facilities were developed there to serve the city's growing population. In 1911, the site was expanded to become the privately owned Glen Echo Amusement Park, a popular facility that operated until 1968.

The National Park Service (NPS) now operates the park, which functions as a regional cultural resource when offering classes, workshops, dances and performances in the visual and performing arts. The park is known for its Streamline Moderne architecture, an antique Dentzel carousel and its historic Spanish Ballroom, as well as for its children's theater and social dance programs. Visitors also come to the park to participate in its festivals and events, which include the Washington Folk Festival and a Family Day.

The NPS maintains a visitors center and conducts park history tours. More than 350,000 people attend events and participate in instructional activities at the park during each year.

== History ==
=== 19th century ===
Twin brothers Edwin and Edward Baltzley—writers, inventors, industrialists, and real estate developers—hoped to build upon the banks of the Potomac River a suburban community free of the urban pollution of late 19th-century Washington. To compete with other suburban developments, the Baltzleys planned a series of opulent attractions for their would-be community.

On February 24, 1891, the Baltzleys incorporated the National Chautauqua of Glen Echo, the 53rd such assembly, and set to building a stone citadel of culture to complement their real estate and resort enterprises. Opened on June 16, 1891, their arts and culture program included lectures and concerts in a 6,000-seat amphitheater; special classes in Bible studies, Greek, and Hebrew; physical training regimens; and university extension courses. Hundreds flocked to the site to picnic and to attend lectures on American history by Jane Meade Welch, courses on ancient Egypt by Lysander Dickerman, and concerts by John Philip Sousa and his band. Clara Barton, encouraged by the Baltzleys, located her home and the American Red Cross headquarters at Glen Echo and also presided over the Women's Executive Committee for the Chautauqua itself. The inaugural season's success warranted an extension well into August.

==== Failure ====
But by the following spring, the various Baltzley enterprises were gravely in debt. On April 7, 1892, the Glen Echo Sand and Building Company, a Baltzley subsidiary, borrowed a large sum of money, giving the Chautauqua site as collateral—just one of several Baltzley mortgages on the site. The financial difficulties spread to the Glen Echo Railroad Company, yet another Baltzley enterprise, which, because of the U.S. Army Corps of Engineers and the adjacent Washington Aqueduct system, had failed to bring the much anticipated streetcar service to the Chautauqua site and Glen Echo Village.

At the beginning of the 1892 season, a rumor spread throughout Washington that Glen Echo was rampant with malaria. Combined with the brothers' precarious finances, the Chautauqua site fell into disuse.

In 1897, the Washington and Great Falls Electric Railway Company completed an electric streetcar line that traveled from a car barn in Georgetown, passed the former Chautauqua site and terminated in Cabin John. "In 1899, the National Chautauqua property was leased to the Glen Echo company, an amusement park venture."

=== 20th century ===
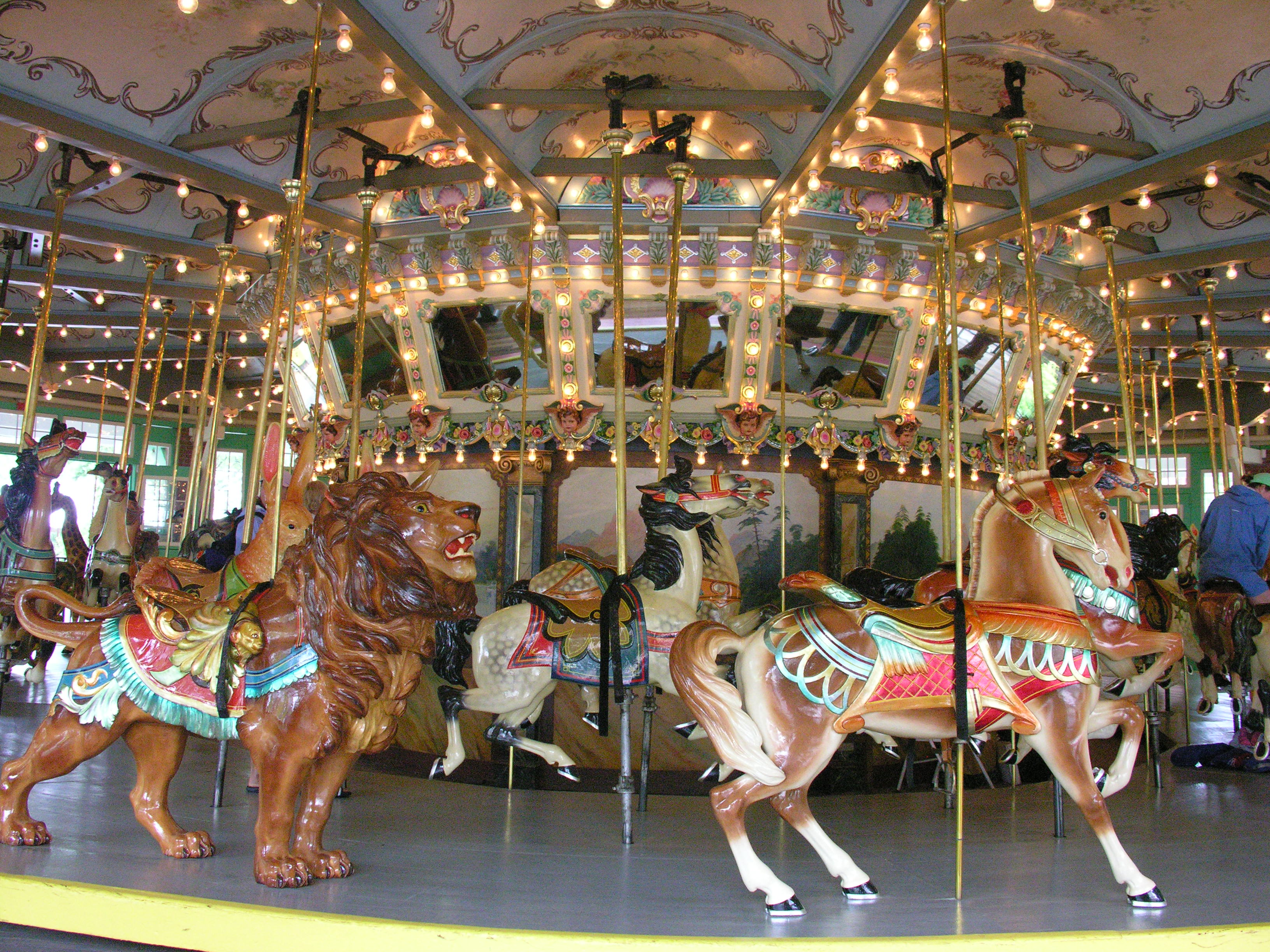
Animals on the park's 1921 carousel

After changing its name to become the Washington Railway and Electric Company (WR&E) in 1902, the railroad constructed a trolley park (a type of amusement park) at the Chautauqua site. "In 1911, the Washington Railway and Electric Company bought Glen Echo and the modern amusement park was built."

Glen Echo Park became one of the larger establishments of its type in the Washington area. Beginning in 1940, the Capital Transit Company (the successor to the WR&E) built a number of Streamline Moderne structures within its facility. The park remained popular well into the late 1940s.

By the mid-1950s, however, attendance began to decline due to the growing popularity of larger regional theme parks such as Disneyland, and also because of the proliferation of new retail products that children of the Baby Boom generation could use during their leisure time. On January 3, 1960, D.C. Transit—the successor to Capital Transit—closed the trolley line that had connected the park to Georgetown, part of the larger abandonment of streetcars in Washington, D.C.

==== Segregation and integration at the amusement park ====
Like many public facilities in and around the Washington area, Glen Echo Park was long restricted to whites—indeed, for 63 out of its first 70 years. On June 30, 1960, to draw attention to the park's racial segregation, the Nonviolent Action Group, led by students from the historically black Howard University organized an 11-week civil-rights campaign against the park's policies.

The campaign began with a sit-in protest on the carousel during which five African-American students were arrested for trespassing. Members of the liberal, politically connected and largely Jewish Bannockburn community near the park joined the students in protesting and picketing for change. As a result, the park opened its doors to all races for the 1961 season.

Four years later, the Supreme Court considered the students' arrests in Griffin v. Maryland. The court reversed the convictions on the grounds that the state of Maryland had unconstitutionally used its police power to help a private business enforce its racial exclusionary policy.

==== Decline and closure ====
On Easter Monday 1966, the park's roller coaster closed early after a cigarette thrown from a coaster car damaged its tracks. When park officials did not explain the reason for the closure, visitors from Washington became disruptive. As tensions flared, the park closed for the day, resulting in a mass exodus of about 6,000 customers.

Reports of slashed seats on the first bus returning to the city prompted D.C. Transit to stop bus service to Glen Echo, stranding hundreds of people at the park. Vandalism occurred during long nighttime walks back to the city, adding to tensions in the communities surrounding the park.

Although the park's popularity had declined severely before this incident, newspaper coverage of the event further discouraged potential customers and dealt a blow from which the park could not recover. Attendance at the park fell when former patrons afraid of recurrences avoided the park. The park also developed a reputation of being a haven for teenage gangs.

In 1968, the U.S. Department of the Interior and the National Capital Planning Commission asked the General Services Administration (GSA) to try to acquire the Glen Echo Property by means of a swap, to include the land and all permanent structures. In April 1969, the park's owners announced that they would not open the park that year.

Over the next two years, they sold most of the rides and other amusements.

==== National Park Service ownership ====
The GSA acquired the title to Glen Echo Park on April 1, 1970. Two months later, the NPS took over administration of the park. The Glen Echo tract and title was officially transferred to the NPS on March 5, 1976. Of the approximately 17 acres (7 ha) that originally came with the title, a portion (7.5 acres (3 ha)) became a part of the Clara Barton National Historic Site while the remainder (9.3 acres (4 ha) became part of the lands of the George Washington Memorial Parkway. After a year of clean-up operations and planning, on June 20, 1971, the National Park Service opened the park to the public for the first of a series of consecutive summer Sunday afternoon events.

=== 21st century ===
In February 2001, the NPS and the government of Montgomery County, Maryland, formed a non-profit partnership to fund and administer the park. The Glen Echo Park Partnership for Arts and Culture took over administration of the park's artistic, cultural, and educational programming while the National Park Service continued to oversee, manage, maintain, preserve, and protect the park's resources.

From 2003 to 2010, the county and NPS made extensive renovations of the park's facilities with input from the partnership and resident organizations and funding from federal, state, and county governments and private donations. The work started with a National Park Service-led, volunteer-labor makeover of the deteriorating Bumper Car Pavilion, converting it into an all-weather dance pavilion and band shell to allow dance events to continue during the subsequent renovations. It remains in use as an alternative dance venue and for private events, such as wedding receptions.

Beginning in 2003, an 18-month, $19 million renovation of the Spanish Ballroom returned it to its original splendor, giving it continued prominence as one of the premiere sites for dancing in the Washington, D.C., area.

Other facilities renovated in the effort included the Dentzel Carousel, the Puppet Co. Playhouse, the Arcade building, the Yellow Barn, Adventure Theatre, the Candy Corner, the Chautauqua Tower, the Ballroom Annex, and the Caretaker's Cottage.

== Features ==
=== Chautauqua Tower ===
- Chautauqua Tower
- U.S. National Register of Historic Places
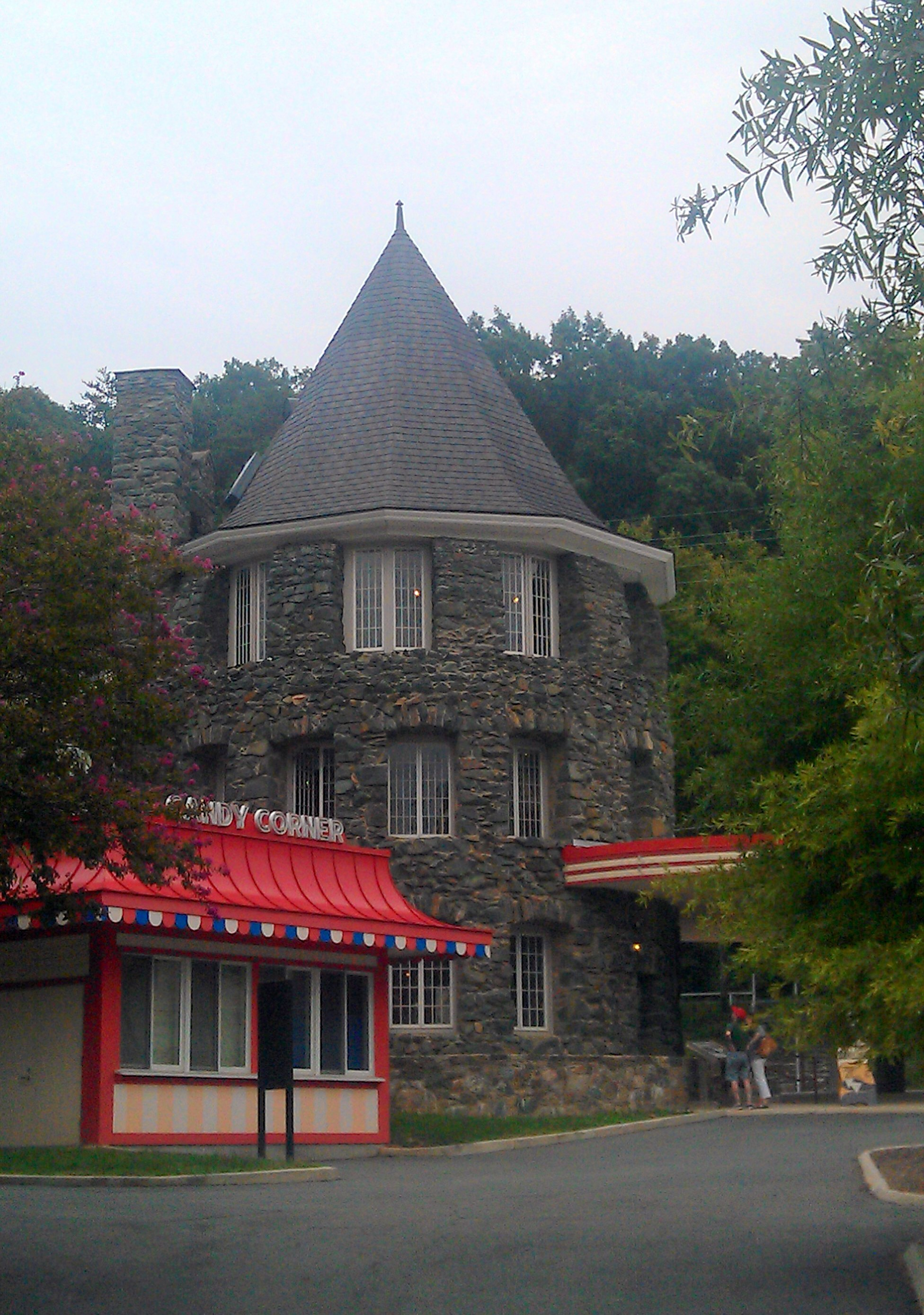
- Chautauqua Tower, September 2011
- Location: Glen Echo Park, Glen Echo, Maryland
- Area: 0.1 acres (0.040 ha)
- Built: 1891
- Architect: Mindelef, Victor
- Architectural style: Late Victorian
- NRHP reference No.: 80000350
- Added to NRHP: July 4, 1980

The central entrance to the park is dominated by Chautauqua Tower, a Richardsonian Romanesque circular structure of irregularly shaped, rough-faced stone.

Construction of the tower was started in 1890 or 1891 and completed in 1892. It is about 34 feet in diameter and three stories high, capped by an 11-sided roof of steep pitch with a flagpole at its peak.

Originally part of a complex of buildings, the tower is the sole intact physical remnant of the late-19th-century Chautauqua movement at Glen Echo, and a local example of late Victorian rustic architecture. It was listed on the National Register of Historic Places in 1980.

The National Register of Historic Places nomination form correctly identifies the architect, Victor Mindeleff, but misspells his name. Mindeleff is best known for his work with the Bureau of American Ethnology.

Today it contains art studios.

=== Dentzel carousel ===
Glen Echo Park's antique carousel was built by the Dentzel Carousel Company in 1921. It was added to the National Register of Historic Places in 1980.

=== PCC streetcar ===
In 2005, the Southeastern Pennsylvania Transport Authority (SEPTA) donated to the NPS a streamlined 1947 PCC streetcar that had served Philadelphia. The NPS installed the trolley on tracks laid in front of the park entrance. A planned $100,000 restoration was canceled for lack of funds, the streetcar deteriorated, and was sold by the GSA and removed in 2012. Its tracks remained in place.

== Current use ==
The Glen Echo Park Partnership for Arts and Culture administers the park's artistic, cultural, and educational programming. It works with resident artists and organizations to develop programming, operates the Dentzel carousel and the Spanish Ballroom, presents a social dance program, produces festivals and special events, and conducts fundraising and marketing.

The National Park Service continues to oversee, manage, maintain, preserve, and protect the park's resources. Both work to promote the park as a destination for the region's population.

=== Resident arts programs ===
Glen Echo Park is home to more than a dozen resident artists and arts organizations that offer classes, concerts, exhibitions, open studios hours, workshops, and lectures. As of 2021, these included: Adventure Theatre MTC, Art Glass Center at Glen Echo, Glen Echo Glassworks, The Sculpture Studio, Nizette Brennan, Glen Echo Pottery, J. Jordan Bruns, Photoworks, Playgroup in the Park, the Puppet Co., SilverWorks, Glen Echo Park Aquarium, Washington Conservatory of Music, Yellow Barn Studio & Gallery, and Young Creative Spirit.

=== Special events and concerts ===
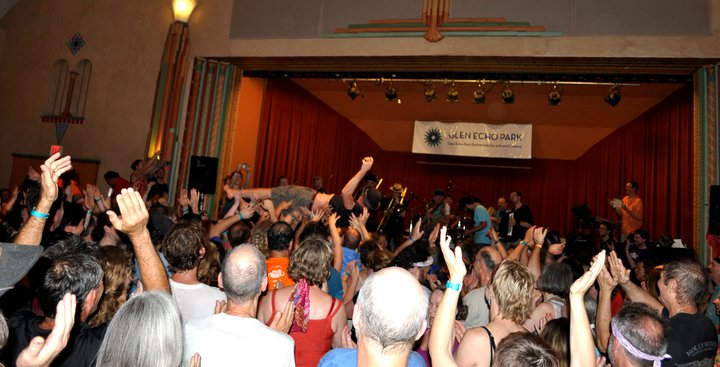
Contrastock festival in 2011

The park hosts several family festivals and special events throughout the year, including Family Day (when the carousel opens for the season), Then & Wow, Labor Day Art Show, Irish Music and Dance Showcase, Washington Folk Festival, (Note: The Washington Folk Festival is a free, two day, family-friendly celebration of the music, song, dance, and craft traditions found in the D.C. metro area.) Fall Frolic, Contrastock, (Note: Contrastock, a word-play on Woodstock, is a day-long contra dance event, featuring multiple sequential bands and dance-callers.) an extensively-decorated Halloween dance, inaugural balls, and Winter's Eve. From June through August, the Glen Echo Park Partnership presents a free summer concert series each Thursday night in the Bumper Car Pavilion.

=== Social dancing ===
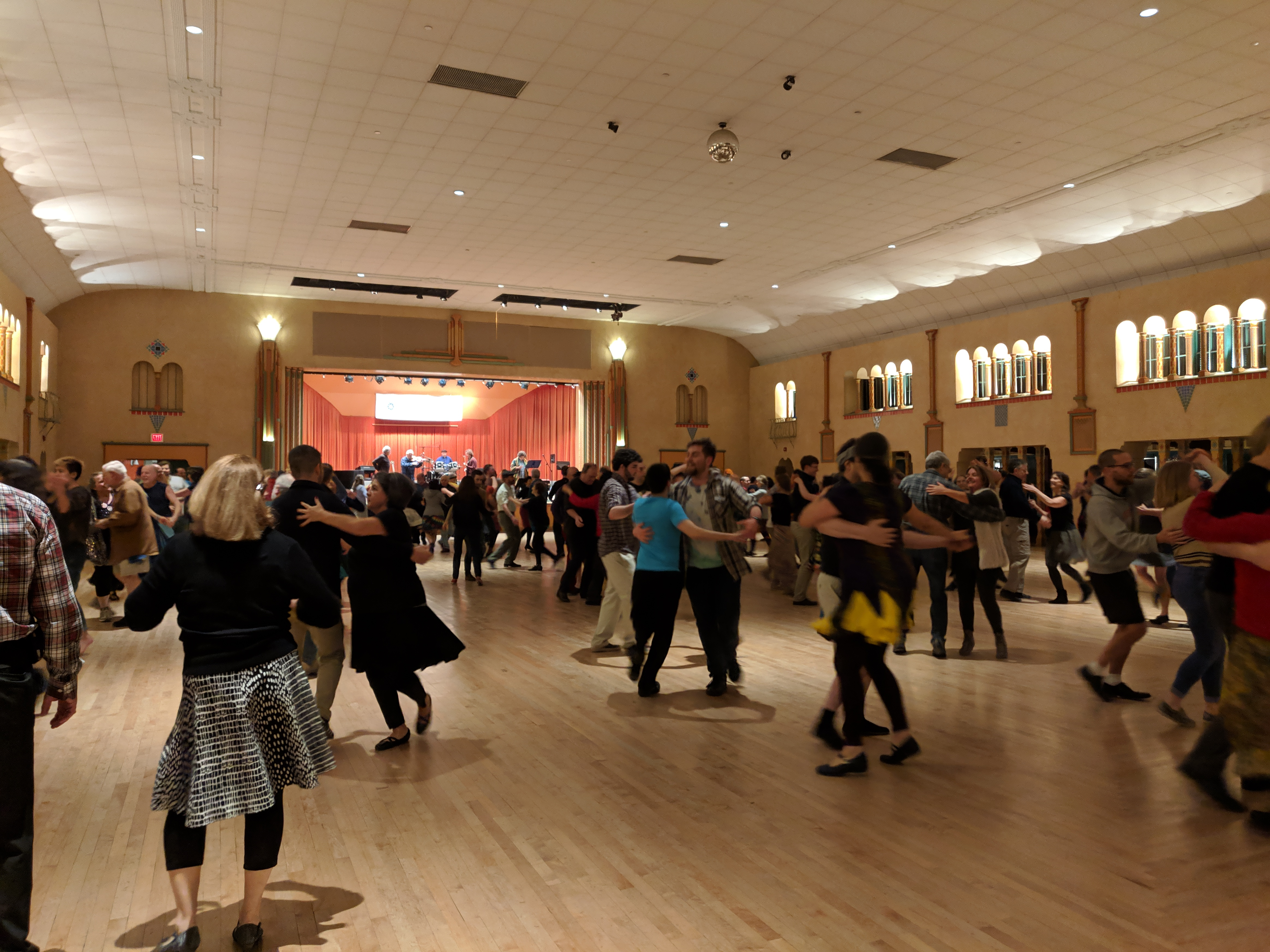
Contra dancers at a Friday night dance in the Spanish Ballroom

Glen Echo Park offers an array of social dance events and classes in waltz, swing, contra, and salsa. Dances take place in the historic Spanish Ballroom, the Bumper Car Pavilion, and the climate-controlled Ballroom Annex (The Back Room).

About 60,000 people attend Glen Echo Park's dances each year.

All social dances are open to the public, for all ages, with no experience or partner required. All dances offer an introductory lesson before the dance begins and most include live music. Alcohol is prohibited on park grounds, and smoking is prohibited in all buildings.

== Incidents ==
- June 23, 1918: The first person to die at the amusement park was Joseph J. Hamel, a 43-year-old stonecutter from Washington. Hamel fell from the "Gravity Railway" roller coaster while sitting on the armrest of one of the coaster's overcrowded cars. He was rushed to Georgetown Hospital but died the next day.
- May 5, 1989: During a Friday-night contra dance, the rain-swollen Minnehaha Creek overflowed its banks. The flood destroyed about 50 vehicles in a parking lot, including about 25 that were swept from the lot and some that ended up in the Potomac River.

== Gallery ==
Pictures of Glen Echo Park are available on Wikimedia Commons.

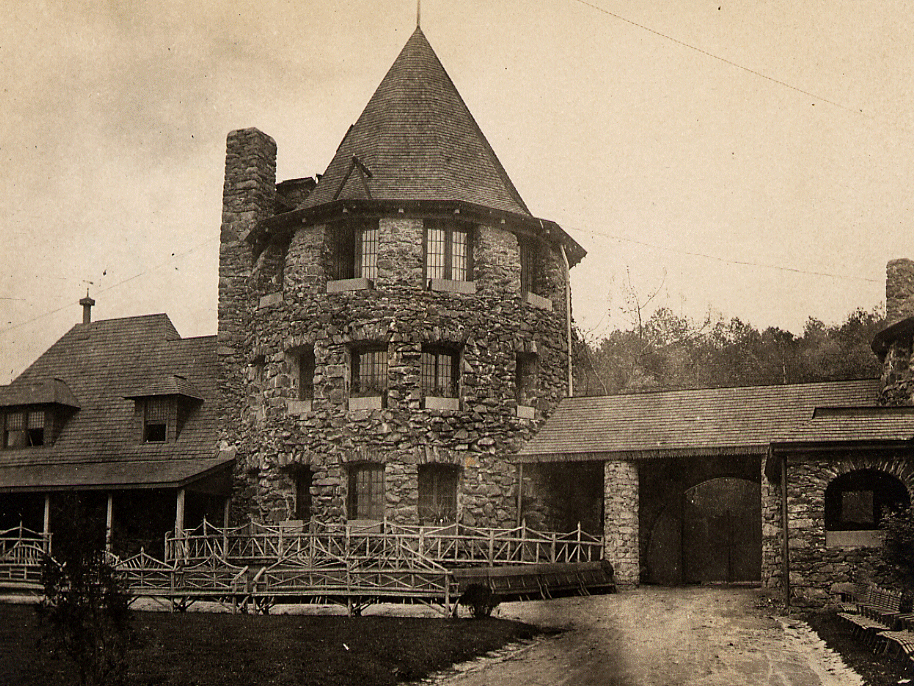
The Chatauqua Tower at Glen Echo

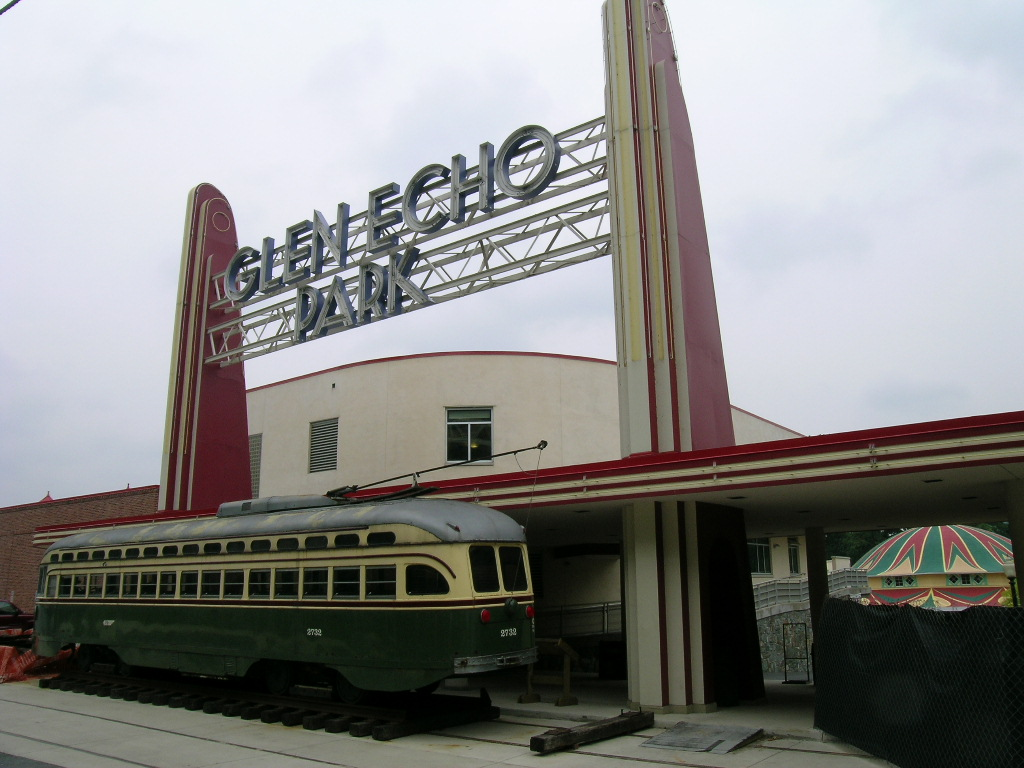
A PCC streetcar at the renovated Streamline Moderne entrance to Glen Echo Park (June 2006)

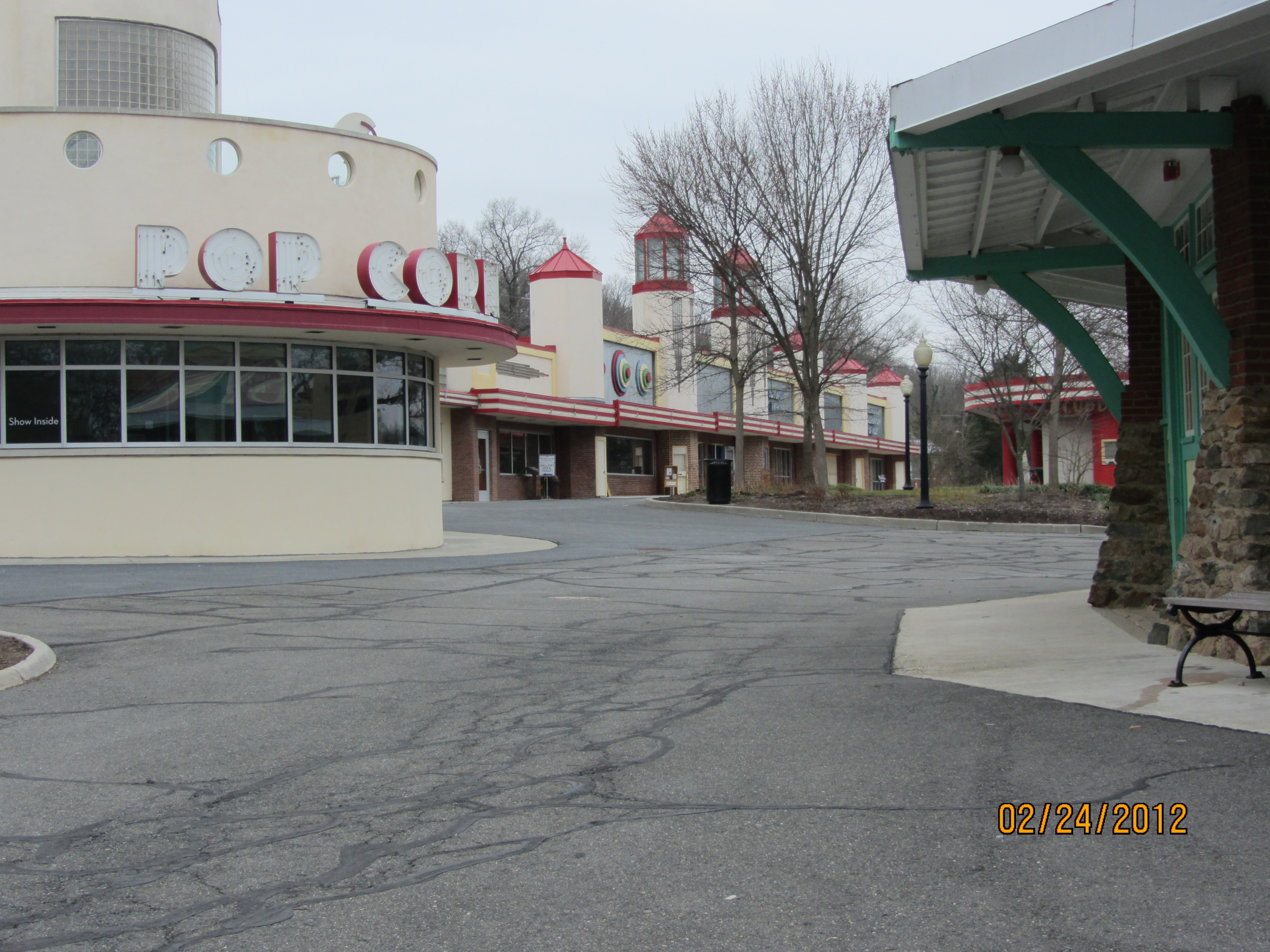
The renovated Streamline Moderne Popcorn Gallery, Visitors Center and Arcade (February 2012)

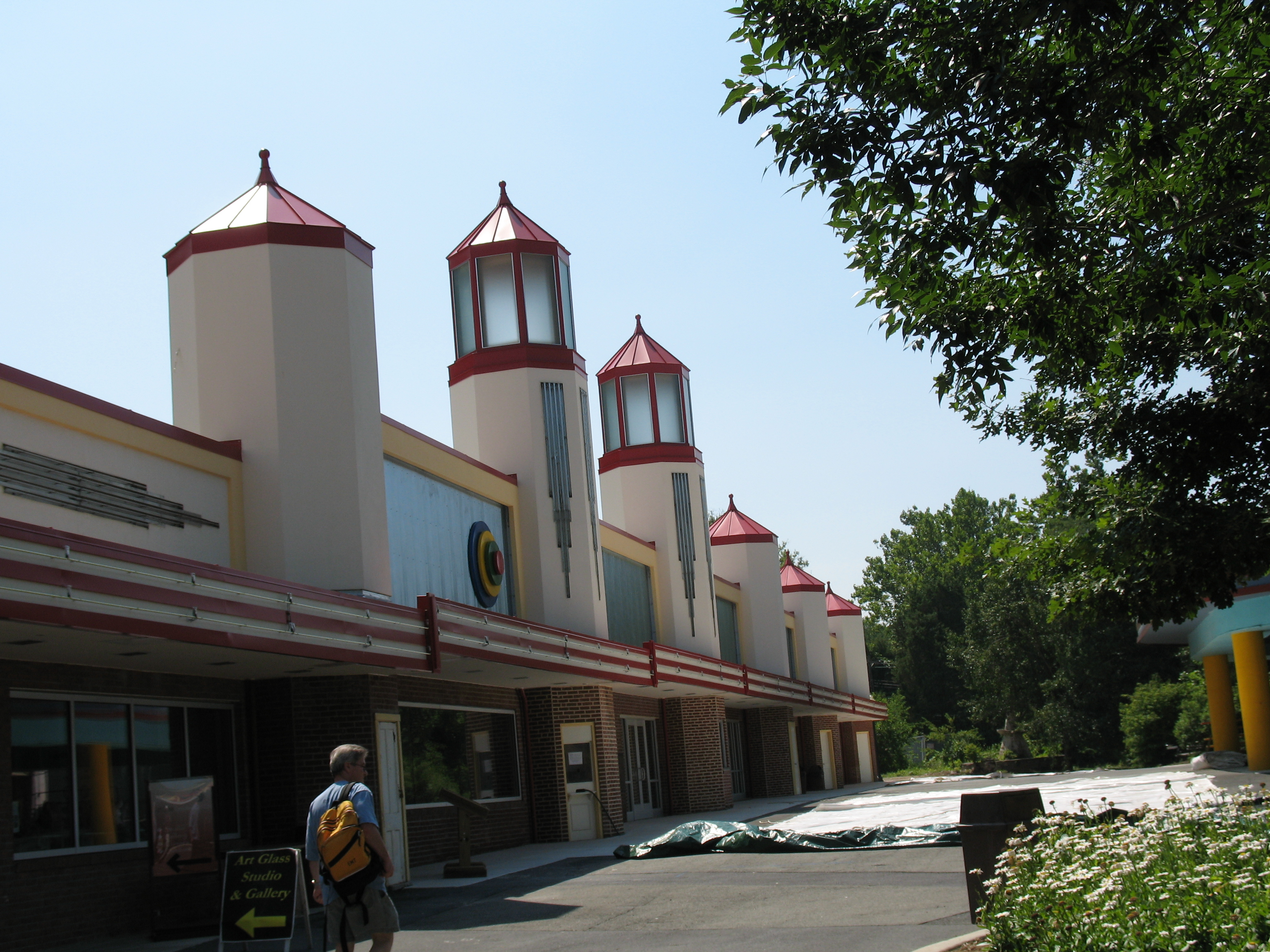
The renovated Streamline Moderne Arcade (June 2006)

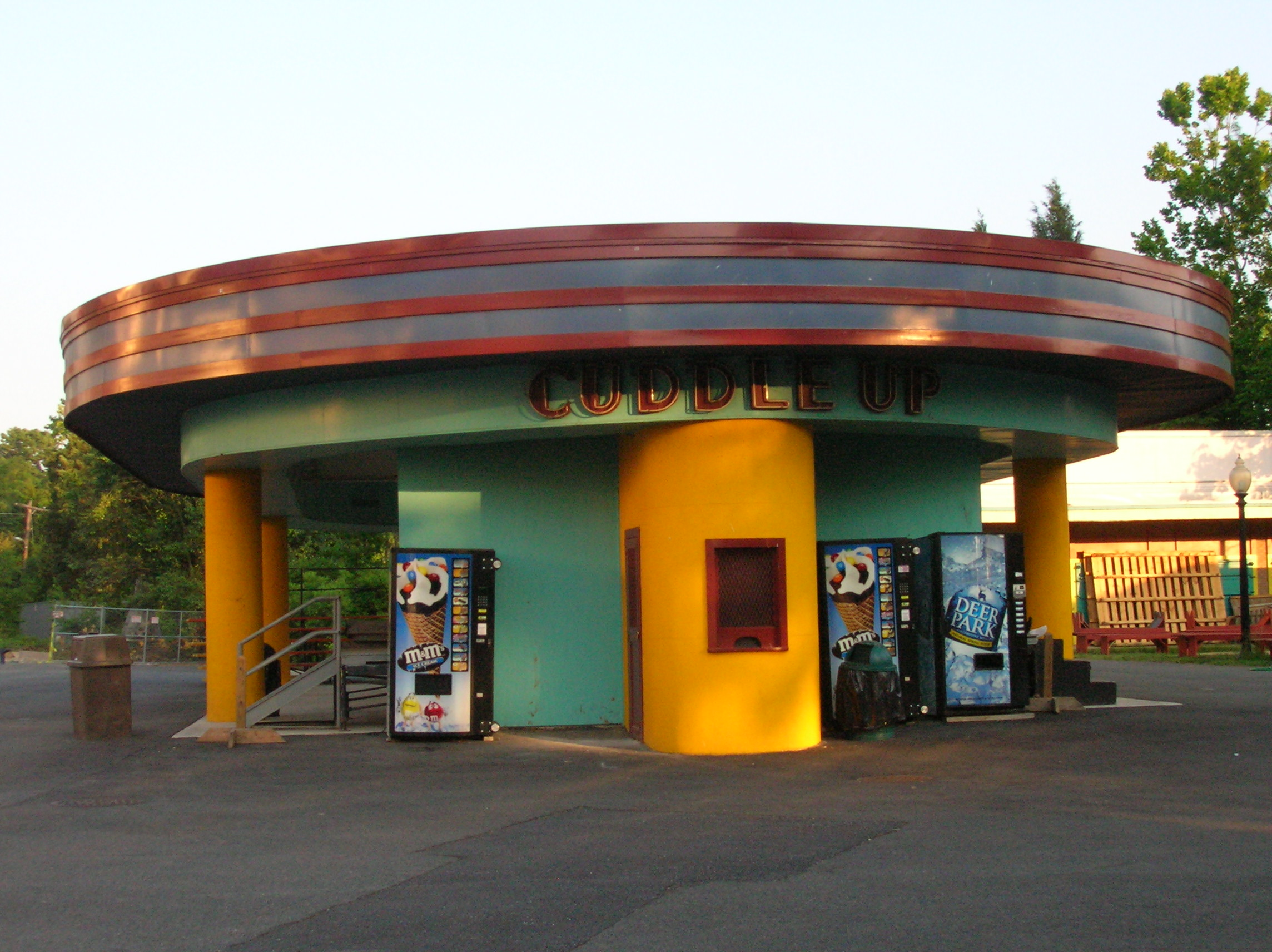
The renovated Streamline Moderne Cuddle Up (May 2006)

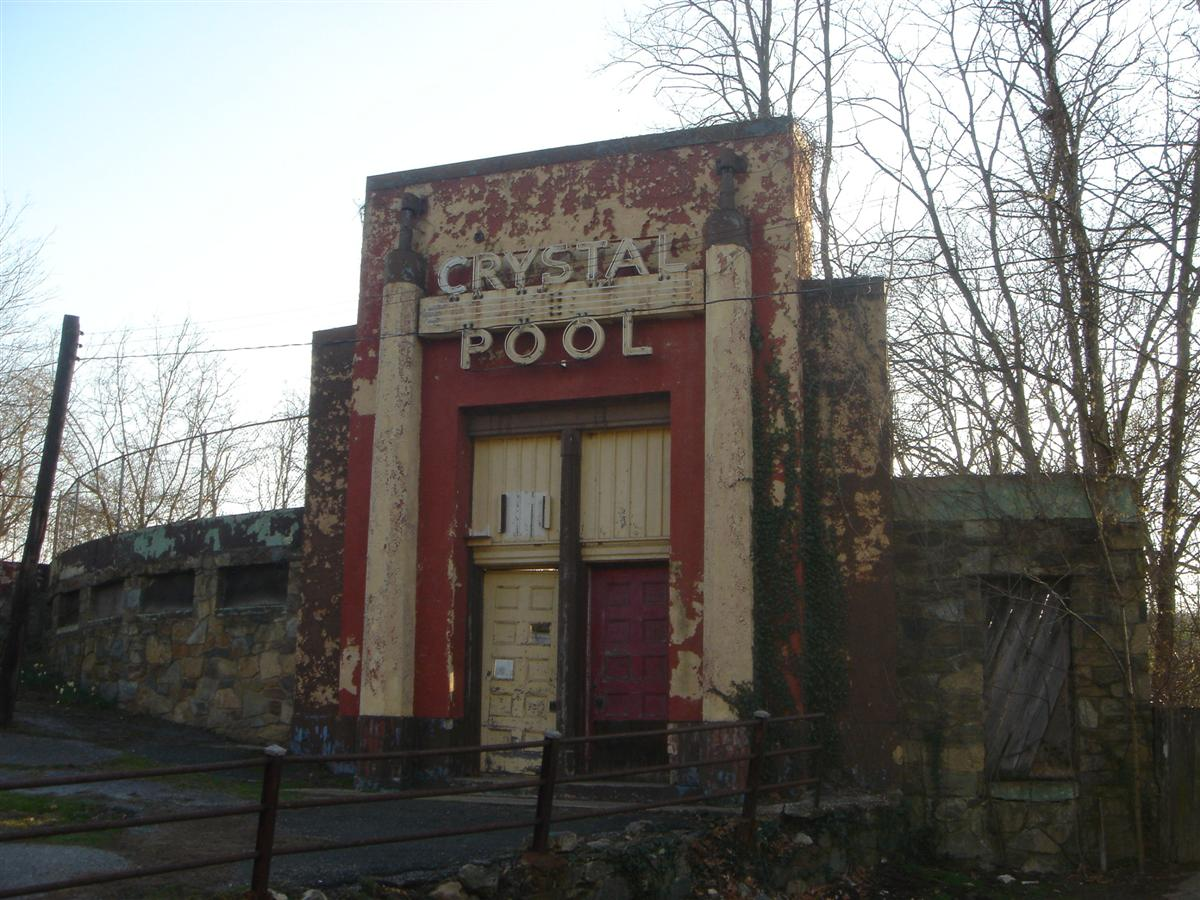
The Streamline Moderne entrance to the Crystal Pool before renovation (August 2007)

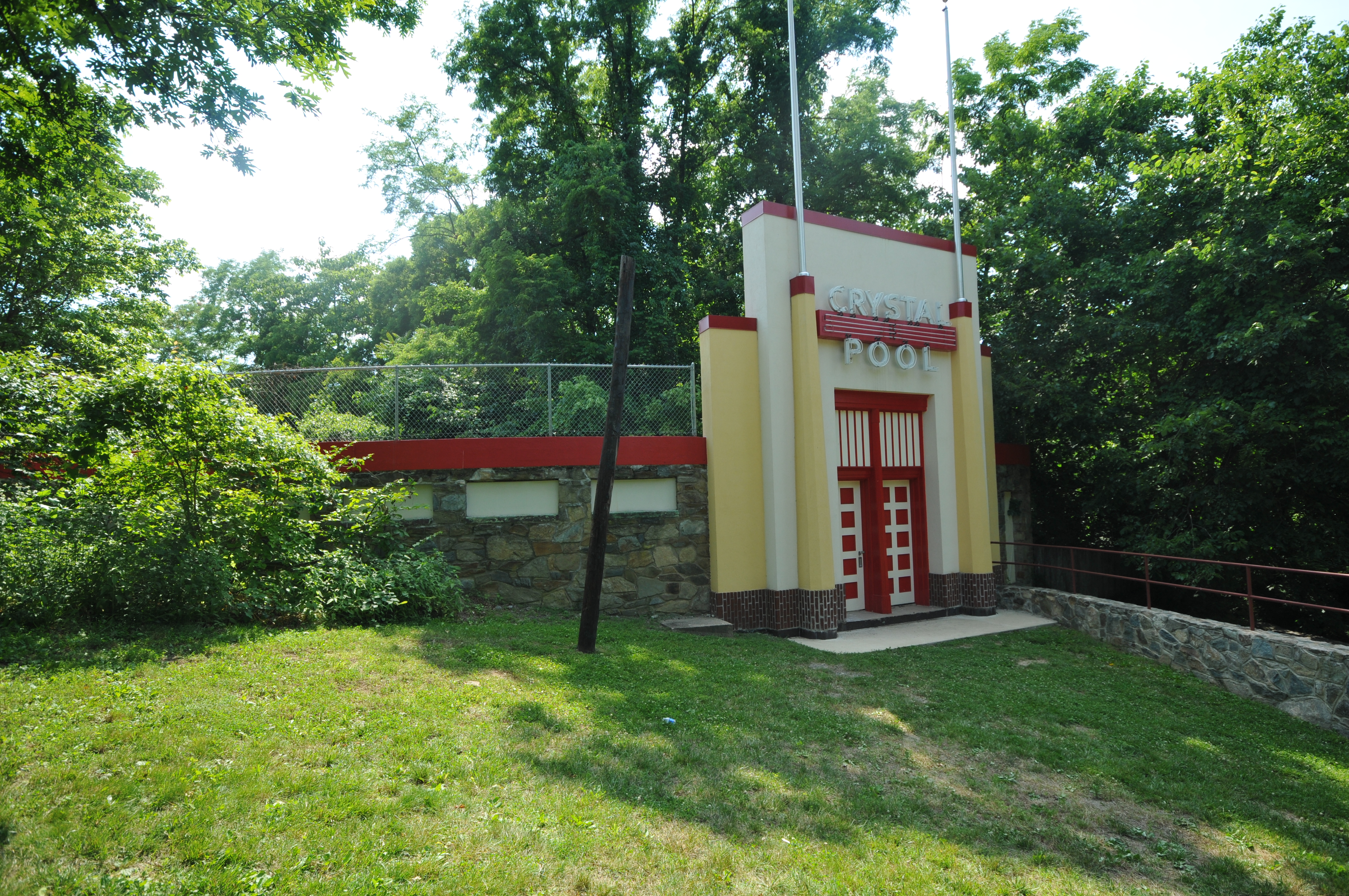
The renovated Streamline Moderne entrance to the Crystal Pool (June 2012)

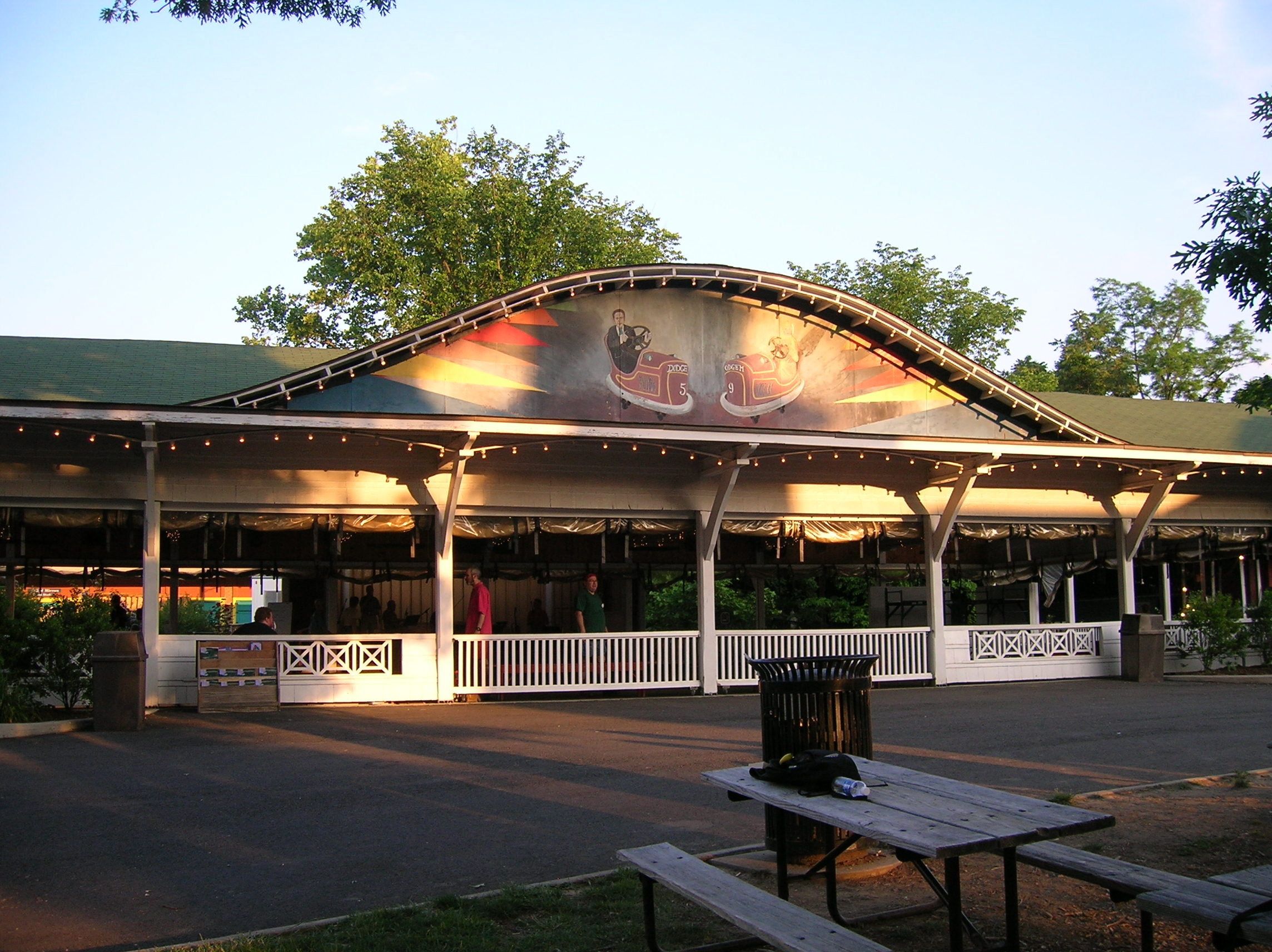
The renovated Bumper Car Pavilion (May 2006)

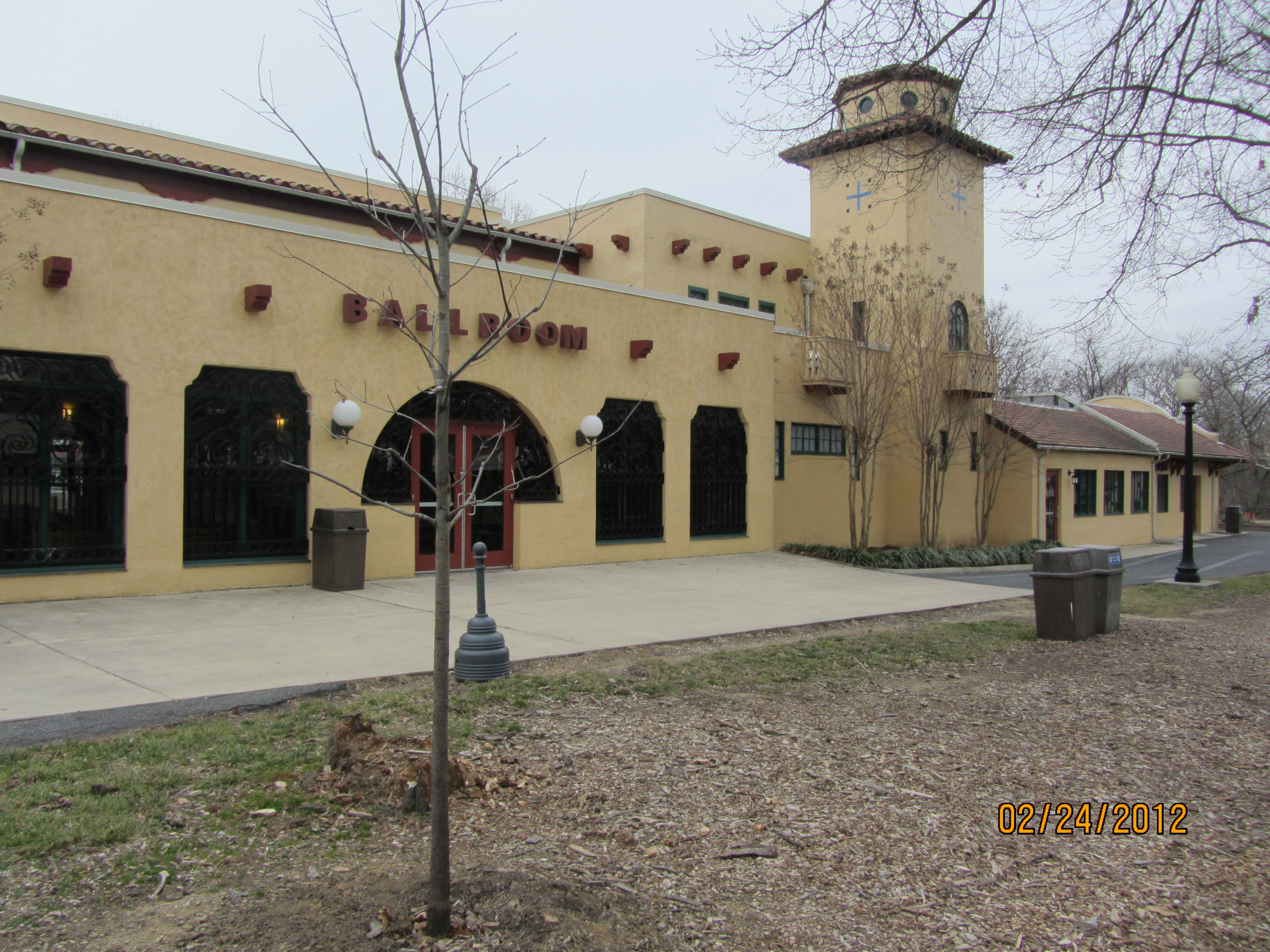
The renovated Spanish Ballroom (February 2012)

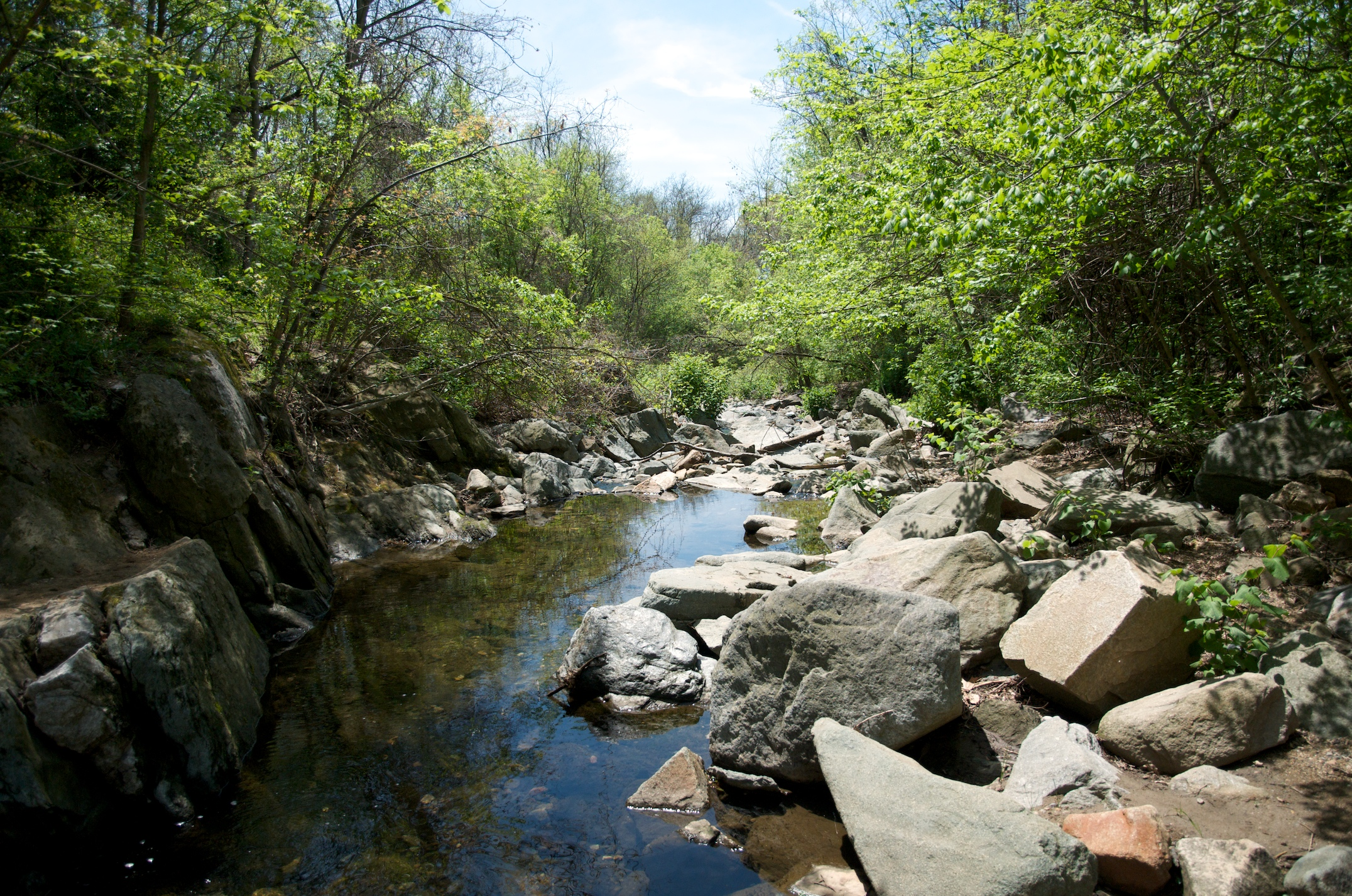
Minnehaha Branch (April 2009)

== See also ==
- Babb's Beach
