= Carousel at Glen Echo Park =

Restored antique carousel in Glen Echo, Maryland

- U.S. National Register of Historic Places
- U.S. Historic district – Contributing property
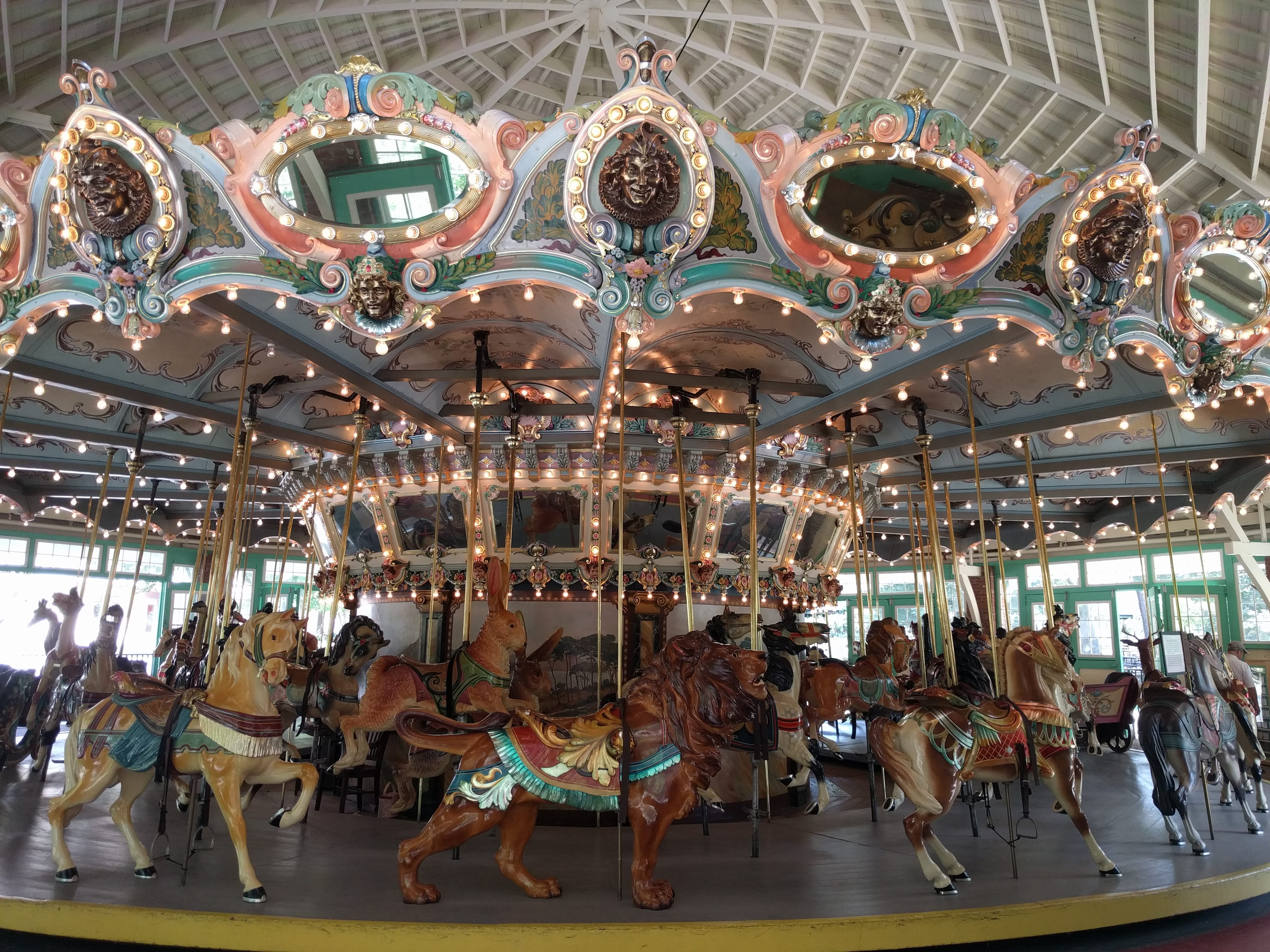
- Animals on the carousel
- Coordinates: 38.9662°N 77.1388°W
- Area: less than one acre
- Built: 1921
- Architect: Dentzel Carousel Company
- Part of: Glen Echo Park Historic District (ID84001850)
- NRHP reference No.: 80000351

Significant dates
- Added to NRHP: July 4, 1980
- Designated CP: June 8, 1993

The Carousel at Glen Echo Park is an antique carousel in Glen Echo Park in Glen Echo, Maryland. It was built by the Dentzel Carousel Company in 1921 and was added to the National Register of Historic Places in 1980.

== Overview ==
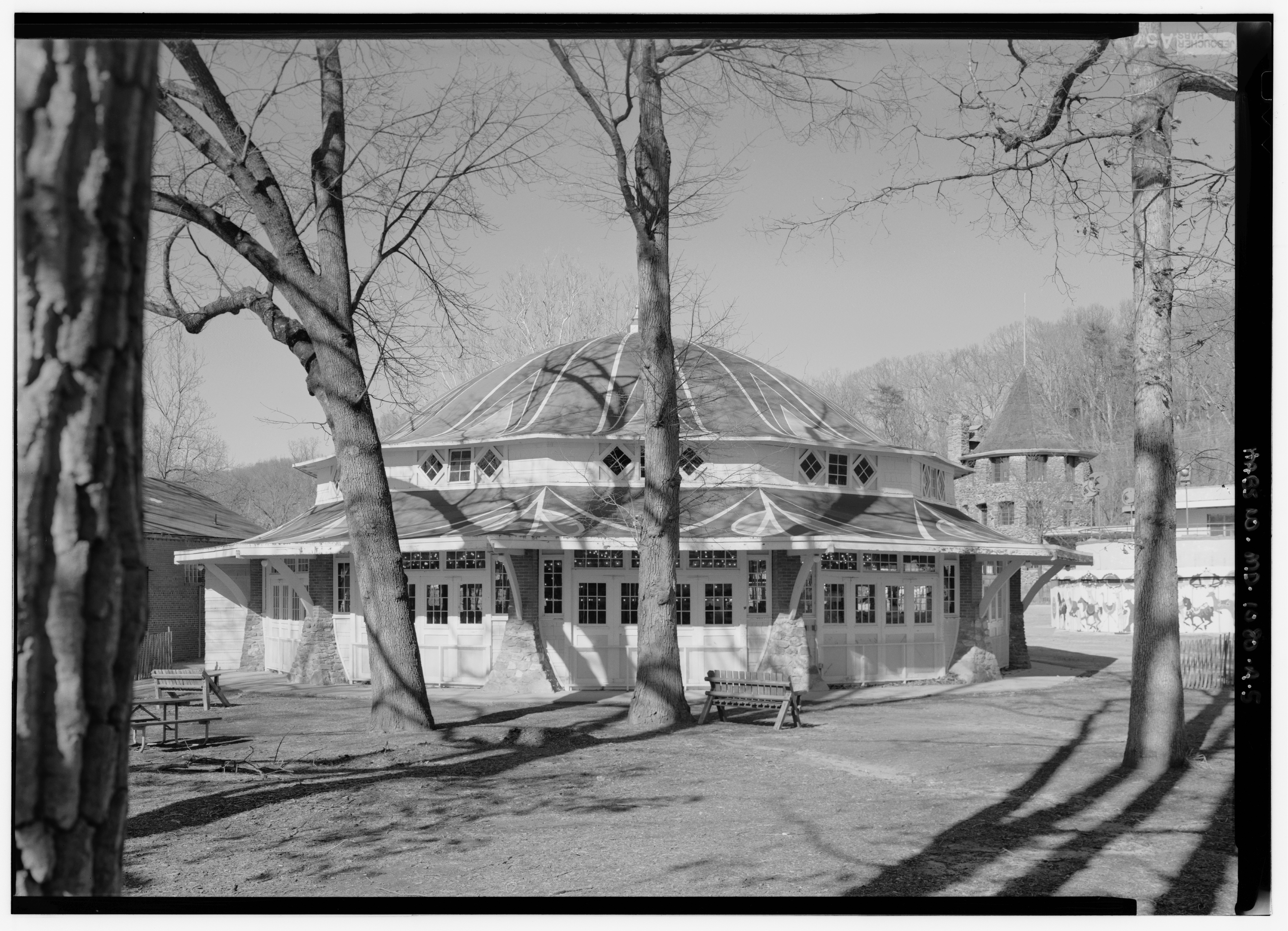
Dentzel Carousel building, Glen Echo Park, in 1997 or 1998

The 1921 Dentzel menagerie carousel is the only park ride that remains from the former Glen Echo Amusement Park. The ride features 39 horses, four rabbits, four ostriches, a lion, a tiger, a giraffe, and a prancing deer. A Wurlitzer Style 165 Band Organ provides the carousel's music. It was built in 1925 and replaced a Wurlitzer 153 band organ at the park in 1926.

In its heyday, the carousel sported an operating brass ring, in which riders could reach out and pull a ring out of a holder next to the carousel. Grabbing a brass ring would win the lucky rider a free ride. The brass ring arm is still visible today, although it no longer operates.

The face of the carousel has changed greatly since 1921, with the animals, rounding boards, inner drum panels, and band organ receiving several new coats of paint over the years. An installation photograph from 1921, as compared to the carousel in 1983, showed an original design of the body and tack on the Indian horse that was different from the present-day animal. Chipping away at the horse's paint revealed several strata of differently colored and styled paint jobs spanning sixty years, with the original 1921 paint at the bottom.

The carousel was restored by specialist Rosa Ragan, who has restored several other carousels in the United States. She restored the Indian horse by removing the park paint, exposing as much of the original paint as possible, and filling in the gaps in the original paint, a process called inpainting, before covering the horse in a protective varnish. This process, however, exposed the original paint to damage from riders, thus rendering the horse unrideable.

In order to restore each animal without risking damage to the original paint, Ragan developed a new process of uncovering the original paint job, recording the colors and design, and then covering the original paint with a reversible varnish before giving the animal a white base coat and repainting it in the original colors. Ragan left a small window of original paint exposed on the inward side of each animal.

The carousel was listed on the National Register of Historic Places in 1980. The carousel was in a scene in the 1989 comedy Chances Are starring Robert Downey Jr. and Cybill Shepherd.

== Gallery ==
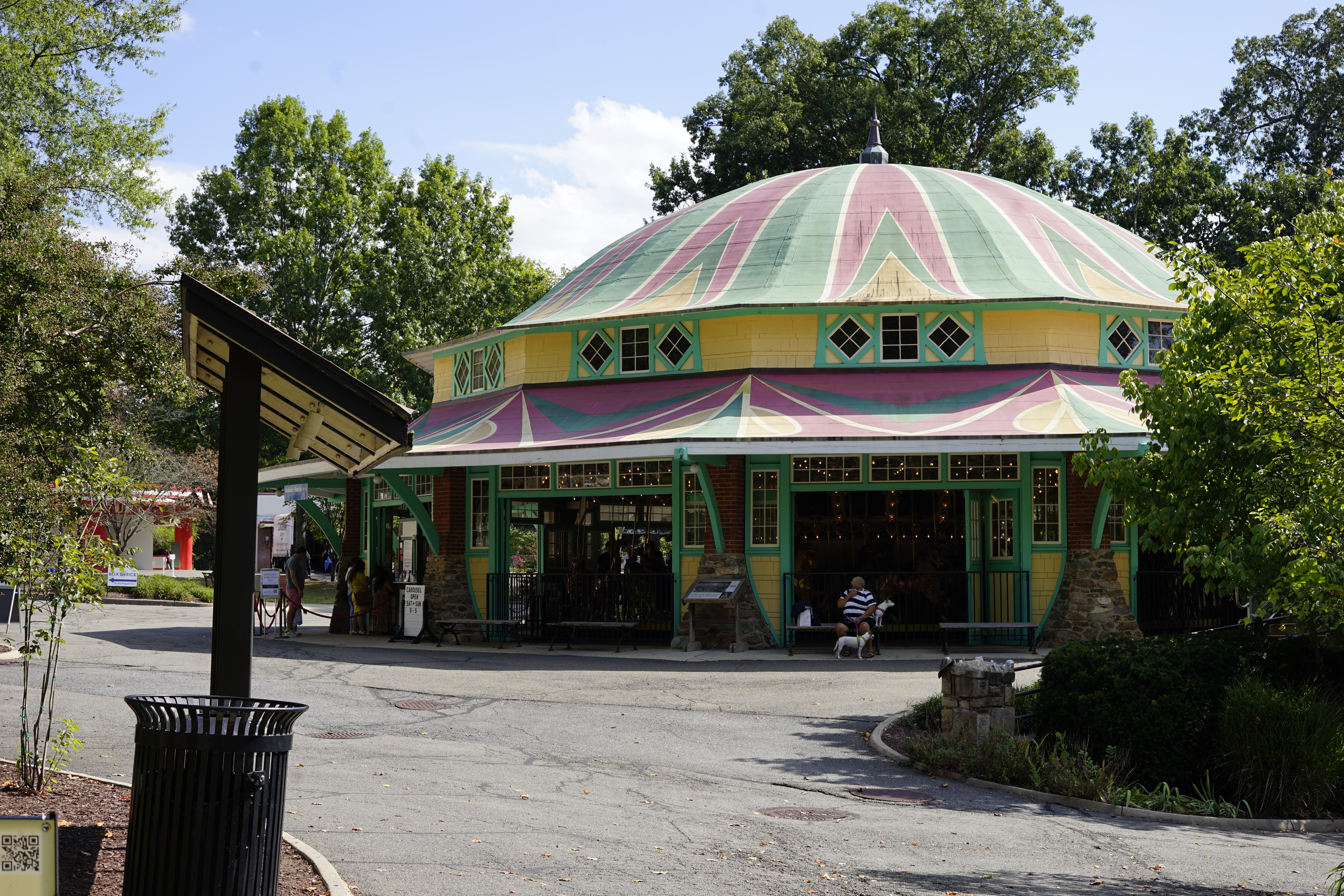
An outside view of the Dentzel Carousel building

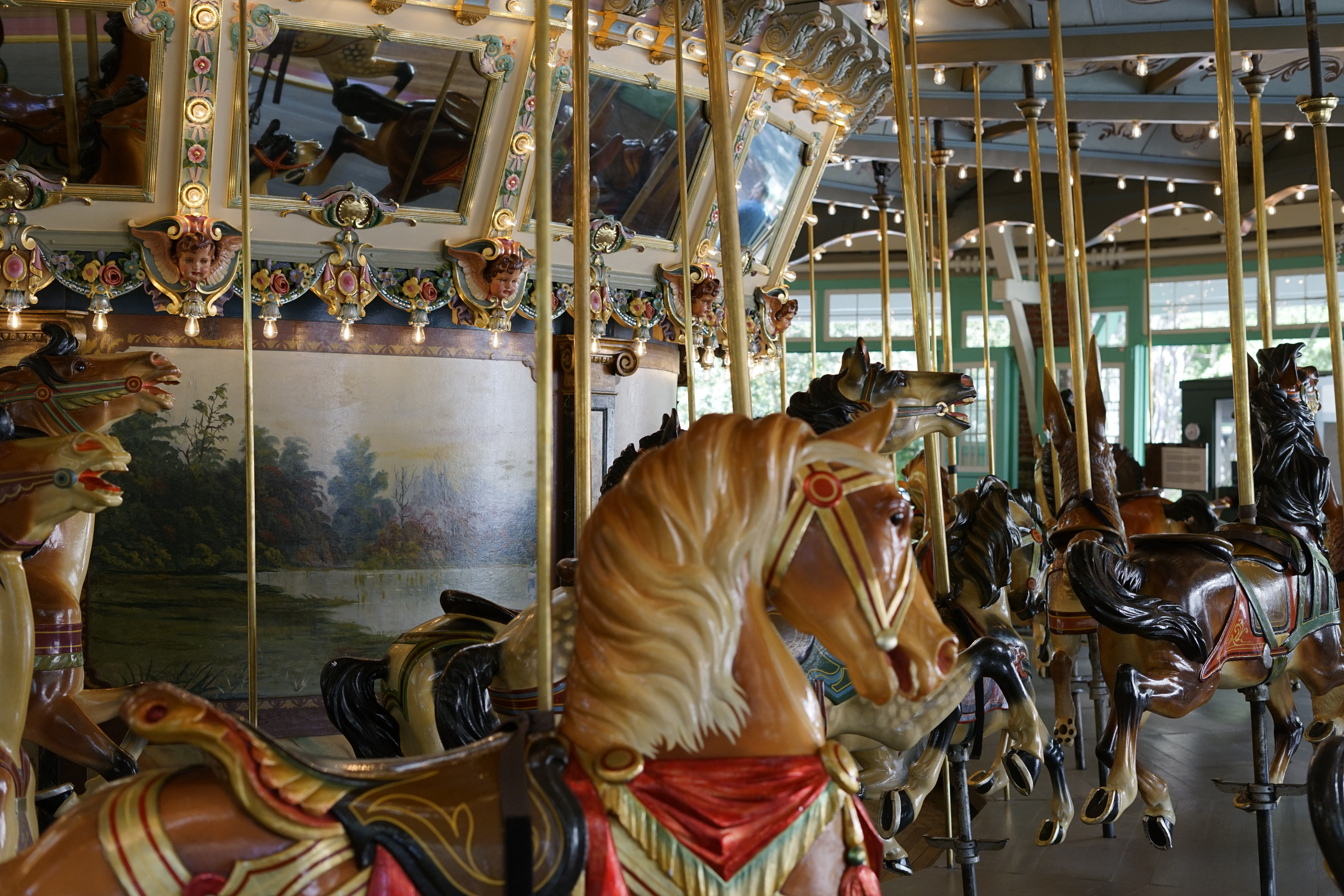
View of the animals from a seat

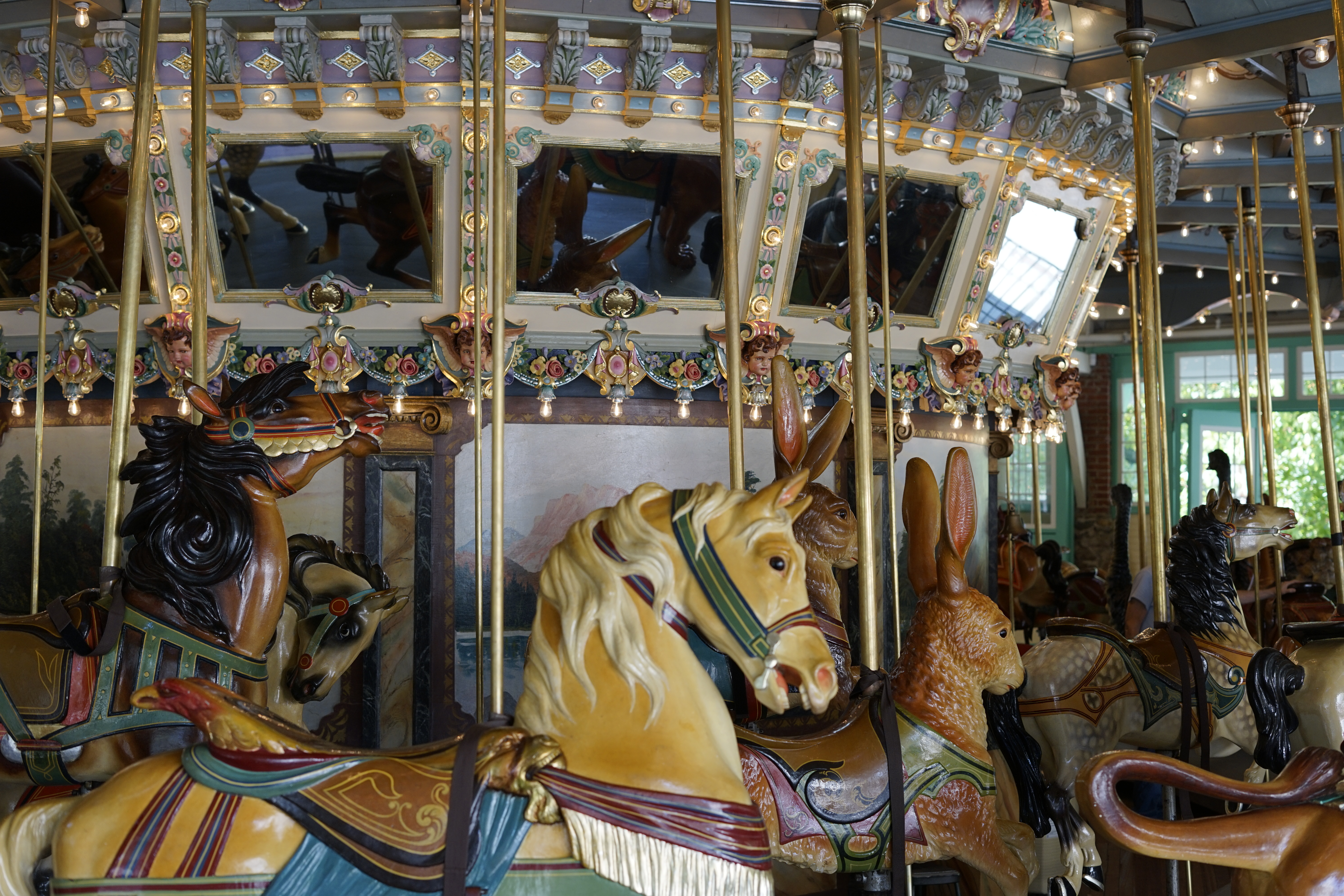
View of the animals from a seat

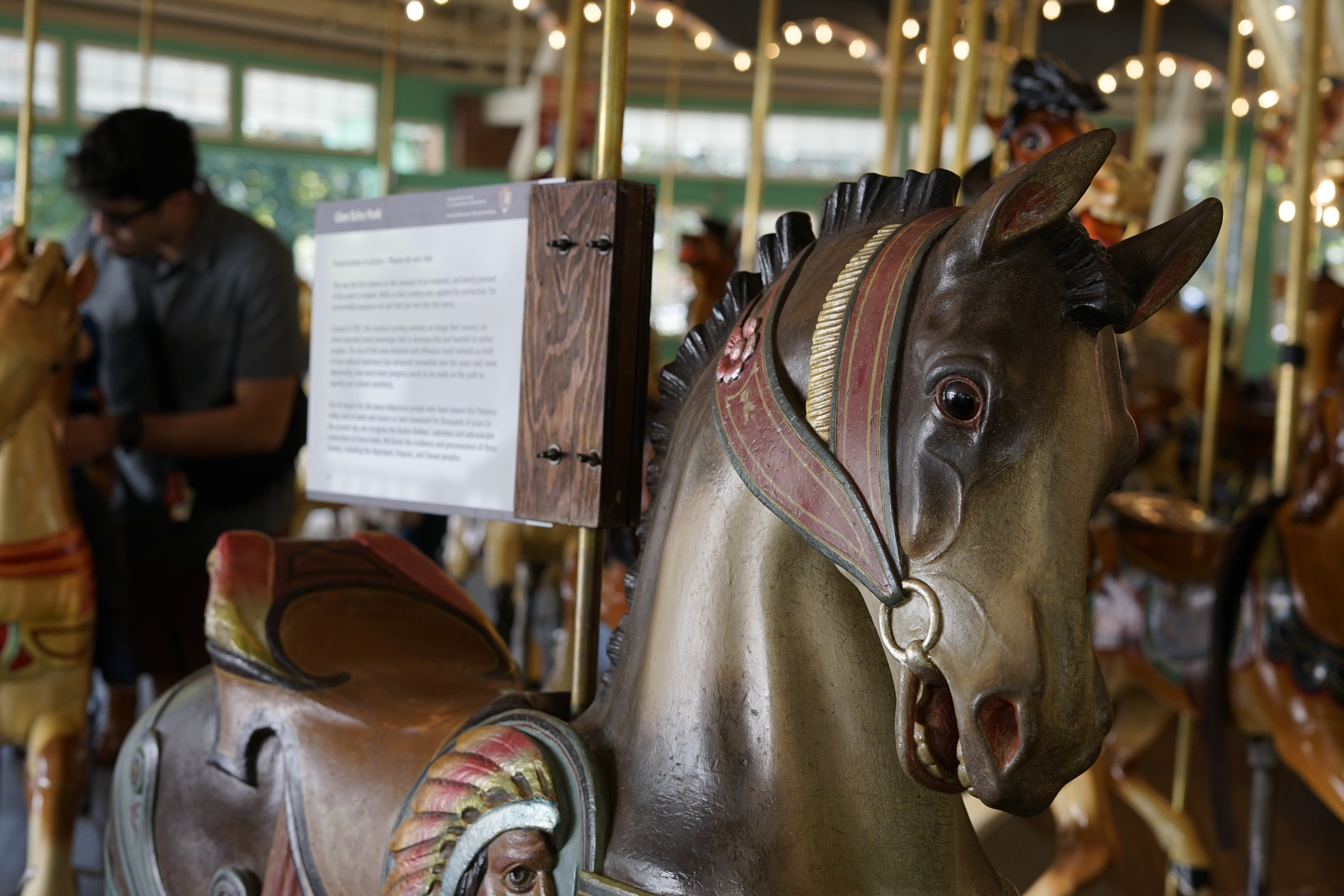
Fully restored Indian Horse

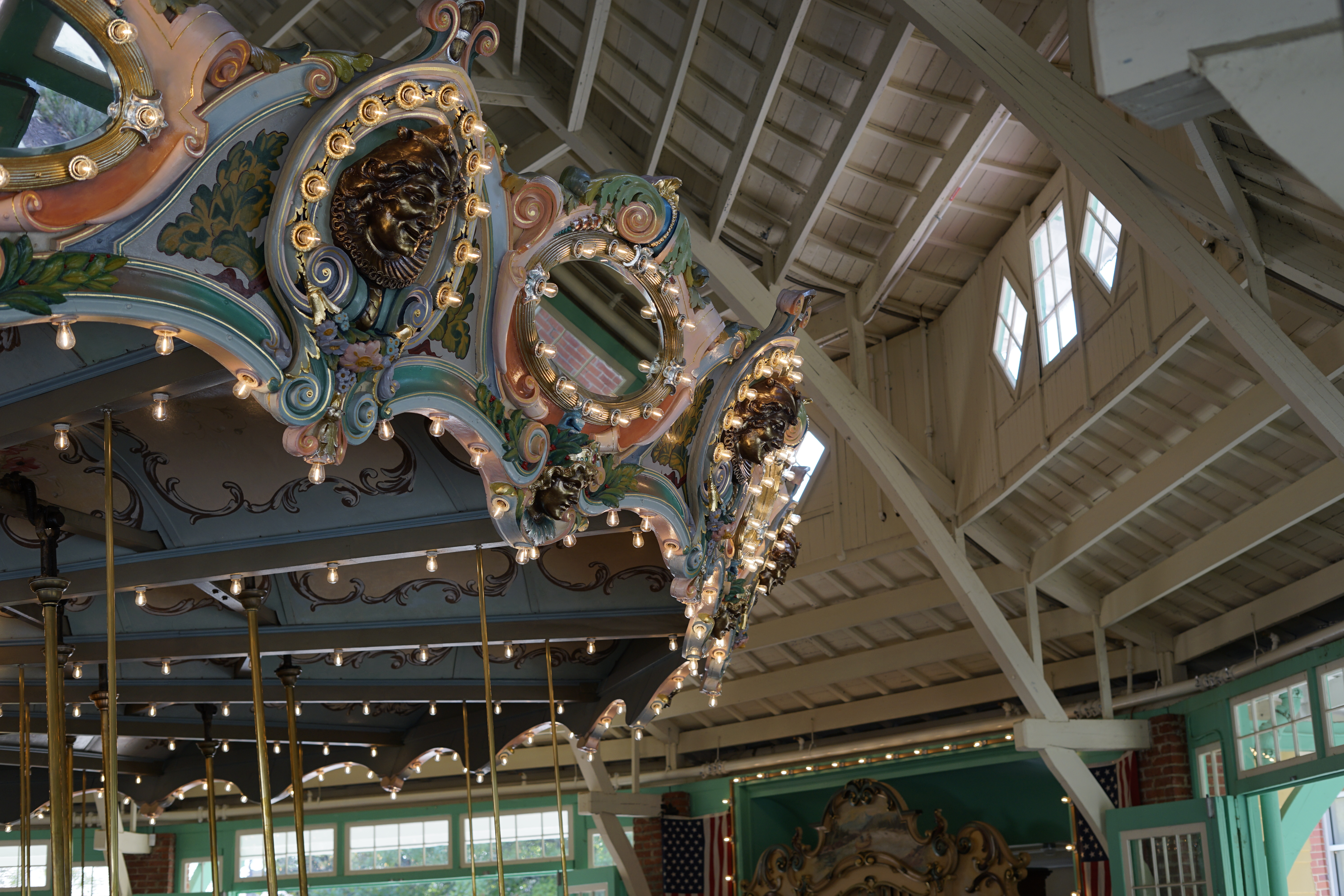
A wider view of the outer running board

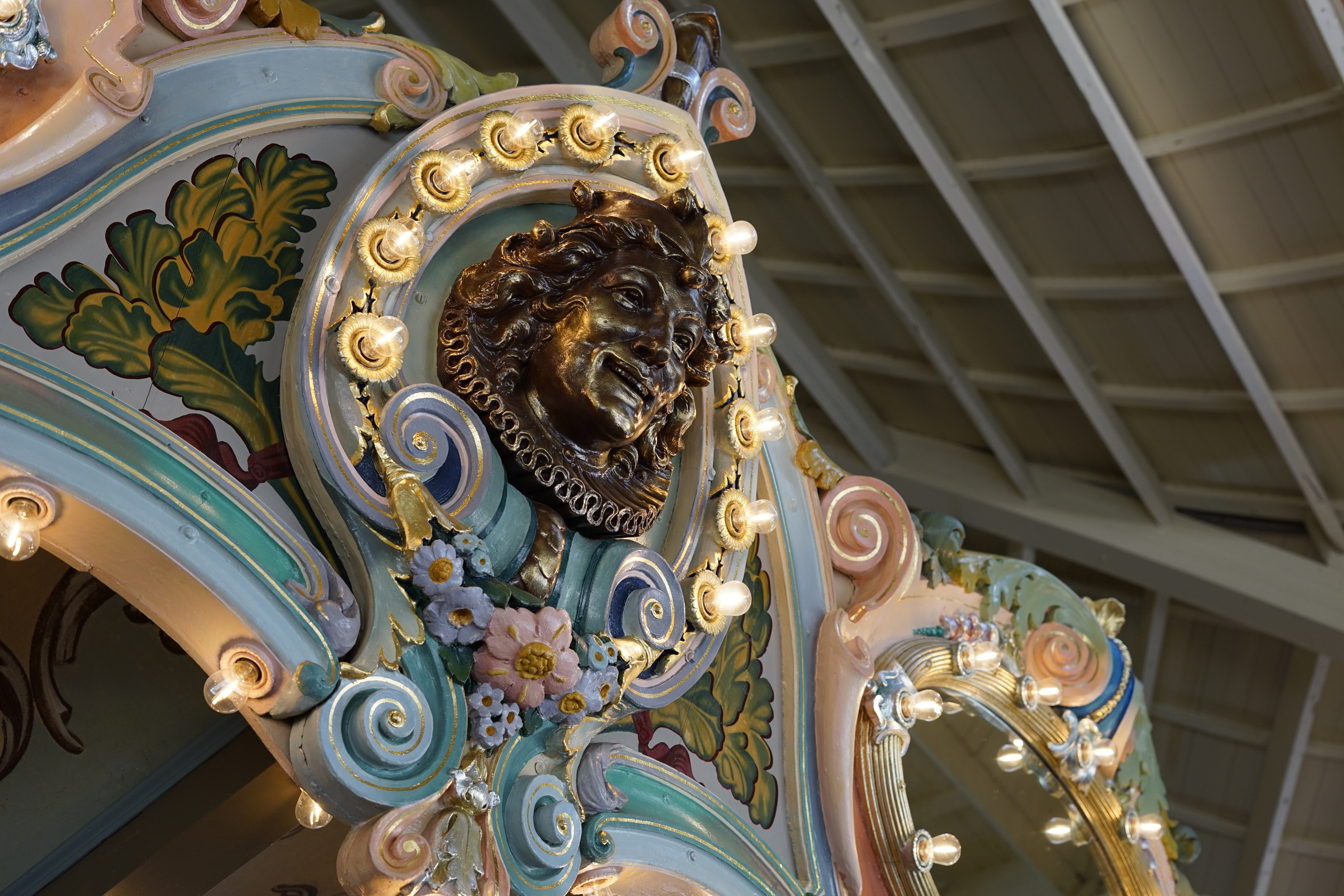
One of the running board jester heads

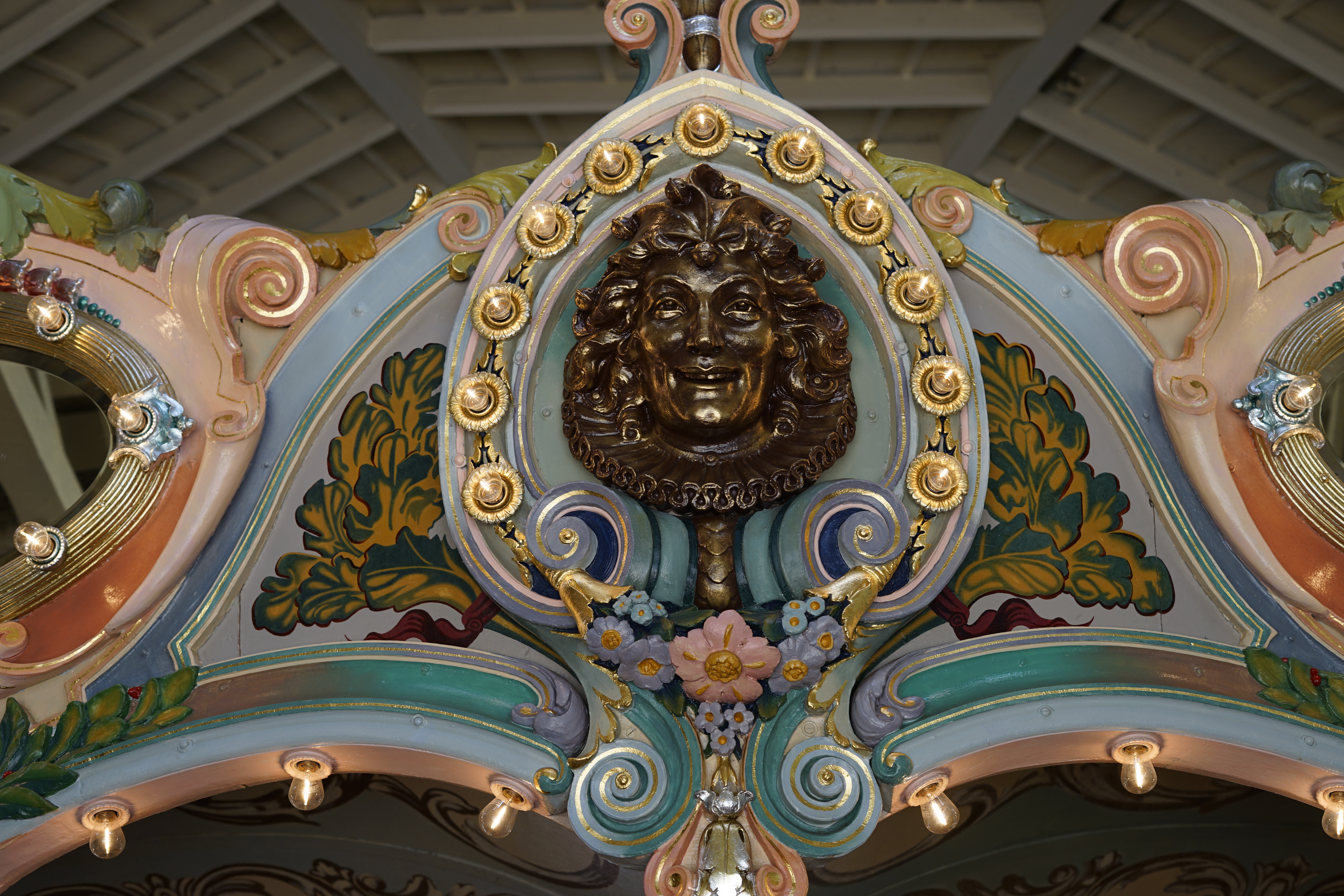
A detailed view of one of the 18 jester heads

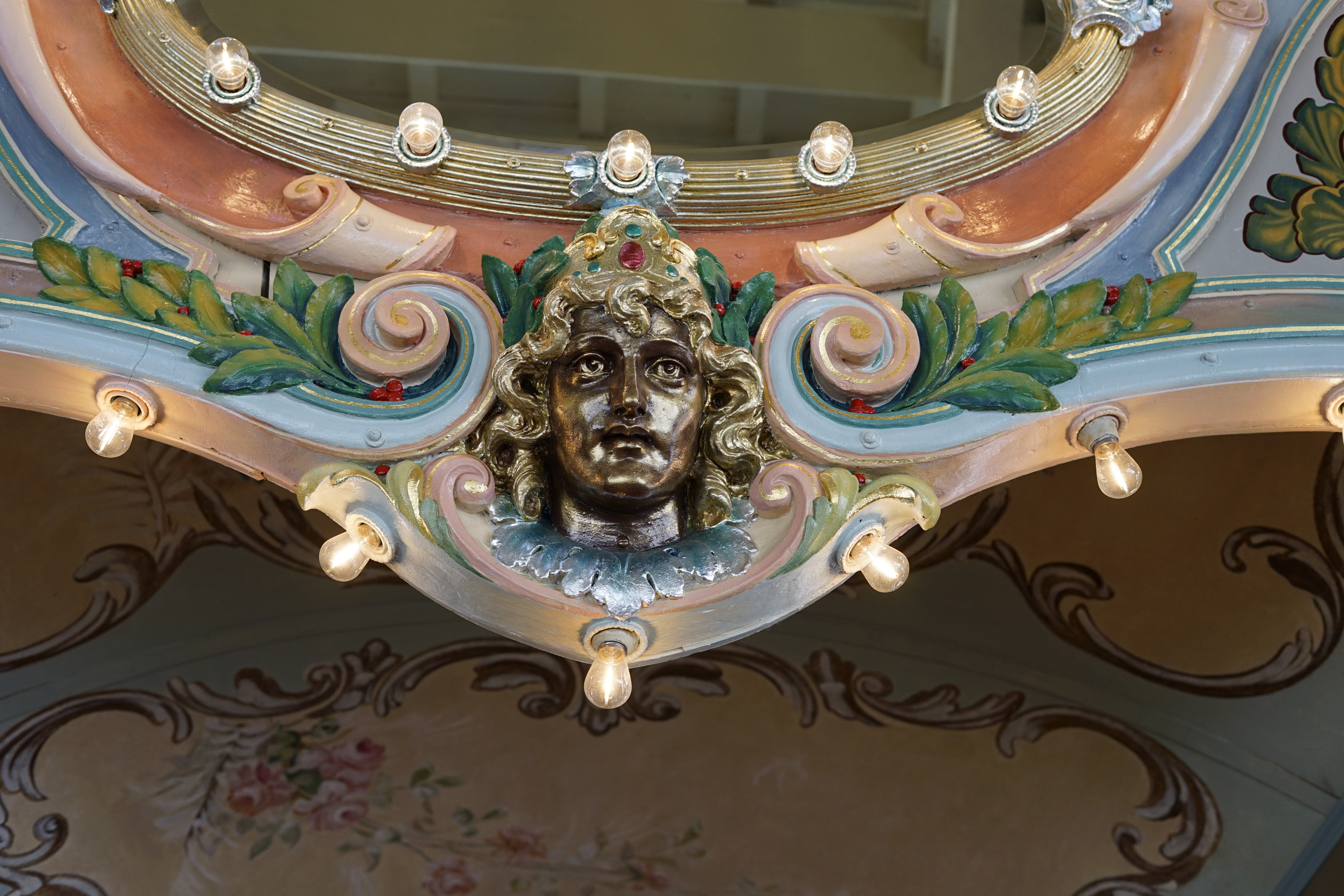
One of the running board princess heads

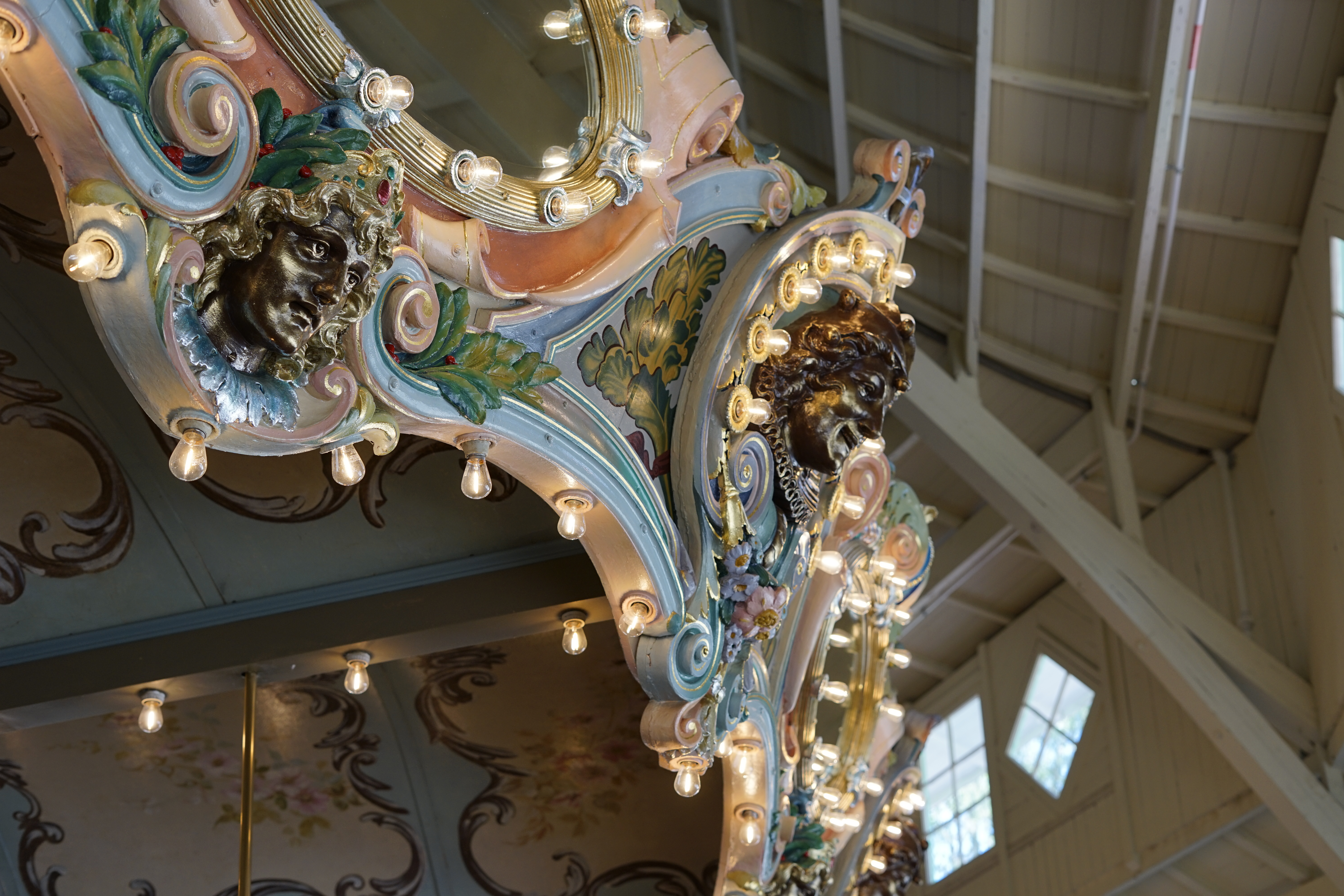
A view of the outer running board along the canopy

== See also ==
- Amusement rides on the National Register of Historic Places
- National Register of Historic Places listings in Montgomery County, Maryland
