= Glen Echo Park Aquarium =

Aquarium in Glen Echo, Maryland, USA

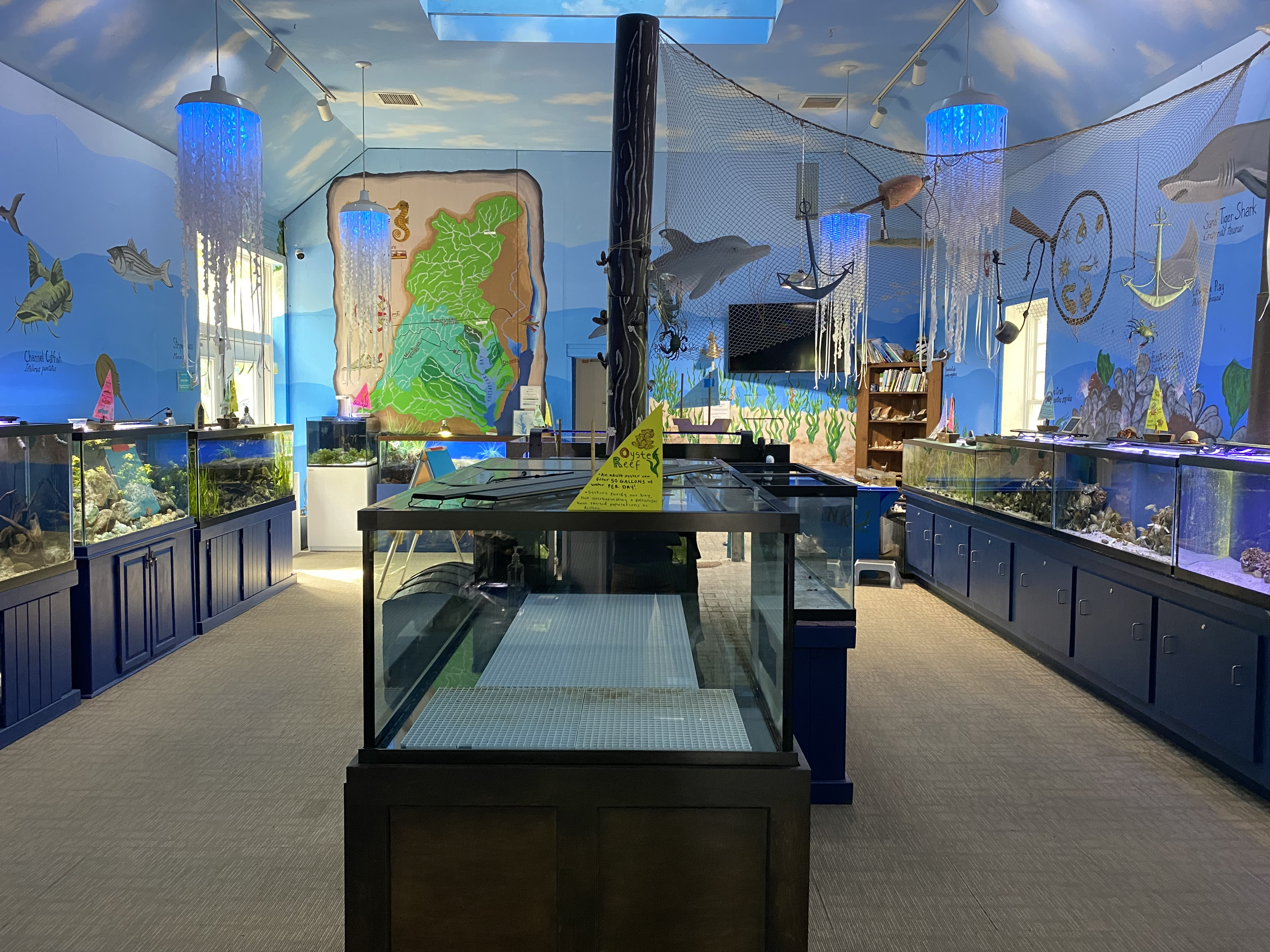
- The interior of the aquarium venue.
- Date opened: September 19, 2015; 10 years ago
- Location: Glen Echo Park; 7300 MacArthur Boulevard; Glen Echo, Maryland 20812 United States
- Land area: 1,200 sq ft (110 m^{2})
- No. of species: 50+
- Owner: Under the Sea
- Public transit: Ride On Route 29
- Website: https://www.gepaquarium.org/

The Glen Echo Park Aquarium is a small public aquarium located on the premises of historic Glen Echo Park in Glen Echo, Maryland. Labeled as a "Chesapeake Bay Discovery Center," the Aquarium’s stated mission is to "promote awareness of the Chesapeake Bay and its watershed through education, in order to encourage stewardship and conservation."

Glen Echo Park Aquarium (GEPA) is currently the only public aquarium in the immediate Washington D.C. area following the closure of the National Aquarium in Washington D.C. in 2013.

== History ==
The Glen Echo Park Aquarium is located on the grounds of the historic Glen Echo Park. It sits on a tract of the park that was previously used for the Living Classrooms Children's Museum, formerly the Discovery Creek Children's Museum. Prior to the museums, the building was used to stable horses in the park.

In the summer of 2015, the Glen Echo Park Aquarium soft launched, opening on weekends for summer camp programs. It held its grand opening on September 19, 2015, the date chosen by the Aquarium director, Andrew Wilson, as it coincided with International Talk Like a Pirate Day. Wilson is the founder of Under the Sea, an educational organization focused on marine biology based in Sterling, Virginia. He had dreamt since his days in the Navy of establishing a place for people to learn about the history and fragile ecosystem of the Chesapeake Bay. The Aquarium was initially staffed primarily by Wilson and his family, before expanding to include other staff, including volunteers.

== Exhibits ==
The Glen Echo Park Aquarium features live animals native to the local Chesapeake Bay estuary, showcased in tanks in a large exhibit hall. The Aquarium is arranged in a way that tells "the story of water" as it flows from streams, creeks, and rivers into the Bay, and out to the Atlantic ocean. In addition to the many tanks, there is a touch tank with horseshoe crabs as the main attraction.

The walls of the venue are decorated with a mural representing a number of native and Bay-visiting animals, such as a manatee and a sand tiger shark. A "discovery table" sits at one end with magnifying glasses, microscopes to allow children and adults to examine marine artifacts and models up close. The Aquarium building sits on a tract of land fenced off from the rest of the park, containing a garden, a sandbox, a water play table, and a wooden pirate ship that guests can board.

== Events ==
The Aquarium hosts birthday parties, special events, and summer camp programs for children. The nature-based camps have children explore the local Minnehaha Creek.

The Aquarium’s parent company, Under the Sea, also conducts outreach programs where they bring live animals to schools and other locations to be exhibited.
