= 2007 Sidecarcross World Championship =

Motorcycle race in 2007

Season
- Grands Prix: 8
- Duration: 9 April–23 September

Drivers
- Champions: (Netherlands) Daniël Willemsen (Switzerland) Reto Grütter
- Sidecarcross des Nations: Latvia

The 2007 FIM Sidecarcross world championship, the 28th edition of the competition, started on 9 April and finished after eight race weekends on 16 September 2007 with Daniël Willemsen taking out the title once more.

== Overview ==
The 2007 season was the 28th edition of the sidecarcross world championship. It resulted in a record sixth world championship for Daniël Willemsen, his fifth in a row, but the first with his new passenger Reto Grütter from Switzerland. The team absolutely dominated the season, winning fifteen out of the sixteen races, of those, the first twelve in a row. Despite this, their winning margin of 89 points was not a new record, this is still held by Kristers Sergis / Artis Rasmanis with 168, set in 2002, however, in a 28 race season. The only race the world champion didn't win, number 13, they team finished outside the points on 24th rank. Second placed Jan Hendrickx / Tim Smeuninx did not win a race all season but nine podium finishes and the fact that the team saw the final flag in all races put them well ahead of place three. Kristers Sergis, five times world champion, came third in the 2007 season, with eight second places and a win to his name, in their home GP. Apart from this performances, his results were not strong enough for a sixth title.

The eight races of the season were held in six countries, France, Belgium, Germany, Croatia, Latvia and the Netherlands.

== Format ==
Every Grand Prix weekend is split into two races, both held on the same day. This means the 2007 season with its eight Grand Prix had sixteen races. Each race is currently 30 minutes plus 2 rounds long. The 2007 season had 60 teams registered but not all of them raced in every event. Teams go through a qualifying, usually on Saturday. Typically, around 50 teams compete for 30 spots on the starting grid, meaning around 20 teams miss out on the race altogether. Some teams did not actually get a race start all season, failing in qualifying each time. All up, 48 of those teams gained competition points. Only three teams qualified but never scored any points. About fifteen teams never achieved to get above the cut.

The first twenty teams of each race scored competition points, allocated accordingly to the following system:

Place	Points
1	25
2	22
3	20
4	18
5	16
6	15
7	14
8	13
9	12
10	11

Place	Points
11	10
12	9
13	8
14	7
15	6
16	5
17	4
18	3
19	2
20	1

== Calendar ==
The 2007 season had the same number of races as in the previous year, however, only half the races were held in the same locations as in 2006. The countries hosting GP's however had not changed:

Date	Place	Race winners	GP winner
9 April	(Netherlands) Oldebroek	(Netherlands) Daniël Willemsen / (Switzerland) Reto Grutter	(Netherlands) Daniël Willemsen / (Switzerland) Reto Grutter
9 April	(Netherlands) Oldebroek	(Netherlands) Daniël Willemsen / (Switzerland) Reto Grutter	(Netherlands) Daniël Willemsen / (Switzerland) Reto Grutter
29 April	(France) Plomion	(Netherlands) Daniël Willemsen / (Switzerland) Reto Grutter	(Netherlands) Daniël Willemsen / (Switzerland) Reto Grutter
29 April	(France) Plomion	(Netherlands) Daniël Willemsen / (Switzerland) Reto Grutter	(Netherlands) Daniël Willemsen / (Switzerland) Reto Grutter
6 May	(Croatia) Zabok	(Netherlands) Daniël Willemsen / (Switzerland) Reto Grutter	(Netherlands) Daniël Willemsen / (Switzerland) Reto Grutter
6 May	(Croatia) Zabok	(Netherlands) Daniël Willemsen / (Switzerland) Reto Grutter	(Netherlands) Daniël Willemsen / (Switzerland) Reto Grutter
13 May	(France) Baugé	(Netherlands) Daniël Willemsen / (Switzerland) Reto Grutter	(Netherlands) Daniël Willemsen / (Switzerland) Reto Grutter
13 May	(France) Baugé	(Netherlands) Daniël Willemsen / (Switzerland) Reto Grutter	(Netherlands) Daniël Willemsen / (Switzerland) Reto Grutter
17 June	(Germany) Jauer	(Netherlands) Daniël Willemsen / (Switzerland) Reto Grutter	(Netherlands) Daniël Willemsen / (Switzerland) Reto Grutter
17 June	(Germany) Jauer	(Netherlands) Daniël Willemsen / (Switzerland) Reto Grutter	(Netherlands) Daniël Willemsen / (Switzerland) Reto Grutter
22 June	(Belgium) Neeroeteren	(Netherlands) Daniël Willemsen / (Switzerland) Reto Grutter	(Netherlands) Daniël Willemsen / (Switzerland) Reto Grutter
22 June	(Belgium) Neeroeteren	(Netherlands) Daniël Willemsen / (Switzerland) Reto Grutter	(Netherlands) Daniël Willemsen / (Switzerland) Reto Grutter
12 August	(Latvia) Kegums	(Latvia) Kristers Sergis / Kaspars Stupelis	(Latvia) Kristers Sergis / Kaspars Stupelis
12 August	(Latvia) Kegums	(Netherlands) Daniël Willemsen / (Switzerland) Reto Grutter	(Latvia) Kristers Sergis / Kaspars Stupelis
16 September	(Germany) Rudersberg	(Netherlands) Daniël Willemsen / (Switzerland) Reto Grutter	(Netherlands) Daniël Willemsen / (Switzerland) Reto Grutter
16 September	(Germany) Rudersberg	(Netherlands) Daniël Willemsen / (Switzerland) Reto Grutter	(Netherlands) Daniël Willemsen / (Switzerland) Reto Grutter
23 September	(Denmark) Slagelse	Latvia	

- The Sidecarcross des Nations in Slagelse on 23 September 2007 is a non-championship event but part of the calendar and is denoted by a light blue background in the table above.
- Passengers in italics.

== Classification ==
=== Riders ===
The top ten of the 2007 season:

Position	Driver / Passenger	Equipment	Points	Wins	Second	Third
1	(Netherlands) Daniël Willemsen / (Switzerland) Reto Grütter	Zabel-VMC	375	15	—	—
2	(Belgium) Jan Hendrickx / Tim Smeuninx	Zabel-VMC	286	—	2	7
3	(Latvia) Kristers Sergis / Kaspars Stupelis	KTM-Mefo	242	1	8	1
4	(Switzerland) Andy Burgler / Martin Betschart	KTM-VMC	196	—	—	2
5	(Czech Republic) Vaclav Rozehnal / Marek Rozehnal	Zabel-VMC	191	—	—	—
6	(Latvia) Maris Rupeiks / Haralds Kurpnieks	KTM-AYR	184	—	4	1
7	(Germany) Marco Happich / (Switzerland) Meinrad Schelbert	Zabel-VMC	180	—	1	1
8	(Belgium) Joris Hendrickx / Eli Piccart	KTM-AYR	177	—	—	1
9	(Czech Republic) Tomas Cermak / Ondrej Cermak	JAWA-Mefo	153	—	—	—
10	(Latvia) Janis Daiders / Lauris Daiders	KTM-AYR	148	—	—	—

- Equipment listed is motor and frame.

== Race by race statistics ==
The numbers for every team are allocated according to their 2006 season finish, meaning the world champion received number one and so on. The numbers for drivers not participating this season were not re-allocated, for example number 16 was not used as Uli Müller who finished 16th in 2006 had retired. New entries received a random number. In the last season, 50 teams finished with points in the overall table, every number above this is therefore a new entry or has not scored points the previous year, the exception being the numbers 68 and 116 who should have been numbers 13 and 21. This system makes it possible to see a driver's improvement or decline from last year by comparing number with position.

The sixteen race events finished as follows and resulted in this final table:

P	Driver / Passenger	Equipment	No.	Points	1	2	3	4	5	6	7	8	9	10	11	12	13	14	15	16
1	(Netherlands) Daniël Willemsen / (Switzerland) Reto Grütter	Zabel-VMC	1	375	1	1	1	1	1	1	1	1	1	1	1	1	x	1	1	1
2	(Belgium) Jan Hendrickx / Tim Smeuninx	Zabel-VMC	5	286	2	4	3	3	3	9	3	3	2	7	4	3	3	4	11	9
3	(Latvia) Kristers Serģis / Kaspars Stupelis	KTM-MEFO	19	242	10	2	2	2	x	3	2	2	11	x	2	2	1	2	x	x
4	(Switzerland) Andy Burglar / Martin Betschart	KTM-VMC	6	196	3	3	10	5	4	13	20	10	x	x	8	5	4	8	4	8
5	(Czech Republic) Vaclav Rozehnal / Marek Rozehnal	Zabel-VMC	9	191	x	12	7	14	8	15	14	7	4	6	6	4	5	5	x	5
6	(Latvia) Māris Rupeiks / Haralds Kurpnieks	KTM-AYR	4	184	6	10	x	x	2	2	4	x	12	x	7	x	2	3	5	2
7	(Germany) Marko Happich / (Switzerland) Meinrad Schelbert	Zabel-VMC	3	180	5	x	5	4	11	10	6	x	6	3	14	6	x	6	2	x
8	(Belgium) Joris Hendrickx / Eli Piccart	KTM-AYR	7	177	x	14	12	7	14	14	11	5	3	12	5	8	12	10	6	7
9	(Czech Republic) Tomas Cermak / Ondrej Cermak	JAWA-MEFO	18	153	x	x	4	6	10	5	13	x	10	4	10	13	11	14	10	12
10	(Latvia) Jānis Daiders / Lauris Daiders	KTM-AYR	12	148	11	x	11	9	15	6	12	19	8	8	9	7	x	7	x	4
11	(Sweden) Henrik Söderqvist / Tobias Sylwan	Husaberg-AYR	23	139	4	5	6	x	5	x	9	4	x	2					19	3
12	(Netherlands) Carlo van Duijnhoven / Christian Verhagen	Zabel-VMC	15	124	19	16	x	16	7	16	7	16	16	10	11	x	8	9	9	11
13	(United Kingdom) John Watson / Mark Watson	Zabel-VMC	20	116	x	6	x	x	13	11	5	x	5	5	x	x			3	6
14	(Belgium) Nicky Pulinx / Ludo Somers	KTM-AYR	116	95	9	7	8	10	9	4	x	6	x	x	x	x				
15	(Germany) Martin Walter / Andre Saam	Zabel-VMC	22	95	15	20			12	12	18	14	13	11	17	19	7	11	x	10
16	(Netherlands) Jarno van den Boomen / Henry van de Wiel	Zabel-VMC	14	91	7	13	x	x	6	7	15	8	19	13						
17	(Netherlands) Marcel Willemsen / (Germany) Marco Godau	Zabel-BSU	10	82	14	11	x	x	19	x	x	x	9	x	x	9	6	13	12	14
18	(Russia) Evgeny Scherbinin / Sergei Sosnovskikh	MTH-MEFO	2	62	8	15	x	x			x	x			3	10	9	x		
19	(United Kingdom) Scott Wilkinson / Gary Burt	Zabel-VMC	24	62	x	x	14	8			x	9	x	9	x	11			x	13
20	(Austria) Bertram Martin / (Switzerland) Bruna Kaelin	Zabel-VMC	68	53	18	x	9	13	x	8	x	18	7	x	x	x			x	x
21	(Netherlands) Etienne Bax / Marc van Deutekom	Zabel-VMC	51	52	x	x	16	12	17	20	16	13	15	15	x	x			14	x
22	(Netherlands) Marcel Grondman / (Belgium) Alfons Eggers	Zabel-VMC	33	46	12	8					8	x	14	20	19	x				
23	(Germany) Thomas Morch / Marius Strauss	Zabel-BSU	75	38									18	19			14	15	8	15
24	(United Kingdom) Stuart Brown / Luke Peters	Zabel-VMC	8	35	13	9	15	15	x	18	x	x								
25	(Belgium) Geert Devoldere / (France) Edouard Chereau	Husaberg	30	35	17	x	17	x	x	x	x	x	x	14	18	17	x	16	17	17
26	(United Kingdom) John Lyne / Pete Girling	Zabel-VMC	26	30	x	x			20	19			x	x	x	x	10	12	16	19
27	(Netherlands) Thijs Derks / Roy Derks	Husaberg-BSU	28	27	x	19	19	16	x	x	x	15	x	16	15	20	20	x	x	x
28	(Belgium) Andreas Clohse / (Germany) Phillipe Schmidt	Zabel-VMC	32	26											x	14	13	x	15	16
29	(Germany) Steffan Metz / Billy Hilpert	KTM-AYR	83	23										17	12	12				
30	(Germany) Josef Brustmann / Philip Schmidt	JF-NMP	11	23	16	17													7	x
31	(Czech Republic) Lukas Cerny / Miroslav Vosmik	JAWA-VMC	98	20									17	18	20	15	17	x	20	x
32	(Germany) Werner Wittmann / (France) Guennady Auvray	KTM-NMP	31	18			x	x	18	x	19	11							18	x
33	(Belgium) Kristof Santermans / (Netherlands) Patrick Nieuwenhuizen	Yamaha-SST	25	17	20	x					10	x			16	x			x	x
34	(Latvia) Kārlis Leimanis / Kaspars Liepiņš	KTM-AYR	66	17	x	18	20	x	16	x	17	17								
35	(France) Baptiste Bigand / Julien Bigand	MTH-BSU	43	14			13	x	x	17	x	x	20	x	x	x				
36	(United Kingdom) Andy Eastman / Steve Kirwin	MTH-VMC	198	13											x	16			13	x
37	(France) Jean Marie Ains / Bernard Jayet	KTM-MEFO	42	10			18	18	x	x					x	18			x	20
38	(Estonia) Kert Varik / Erkki Koiv	KTM-AYR	131	9													15	18		
39	(Netherlands) Jan Visscher / Jeroen Visscher	Zabel-VMC	135	9							x	12	x	x						
40	(Belgium) Peter Steegmans / Dagwin Sabbe	MTH-EML	200	8											13	x				
41	(Estonia) Gert Gordejev / Keit Kivaste	KTM-AYR	124	5													18	19		
42	(Russia) Igor Rodionov / Dmitry Rodionov	KTM-AYR	62	5													15	x		
43	(Netherlands) Peter Brussen / Bjorn Roes	Zabel-VMC	52	4													x	17		
44	(Germany) Jürgen Blank / Rainer Semet	Zabel-VMC	84	3															x	18
45	(France) Michael Poirier / Bertrand Poirier	KTM-VMC	29	2			x	20			x	20								
46	(Latvia) Oskars Liepiņš / Ilvars Ameļkins	KTM-AYR	141	2													19	x		
47	(France) Guillaume Martin / Francis Blanco	Zabel-VMC	110	2			x	19												
48	(Estonia) Argo Poldsaar / Tonu Hansar	MTH-AYR	177	1													x	20		
—	(France) David Barat / Guennady Auvray		101	—	x	x														
—	(Netherlands) Wim Janssen / Henk Roenhorst		36	—	x	x														
—	(United Kingdom) David Keane / Andy Heighes		46	—			x	x												

- Where there is only one flag shown, it indicates driver and passenger are from the same country.
- Placings below the first twenty not shown.
- Drivers who never qualified for any GP not shown.
- x denotes qualified for race but finished outside of points.
- Passengers in italics.

== Manufacturers ==
The manufacturers of side car frames are very specialized companies, catering for a small market, but within this they are very well known. Engines can be large half litre off-the-line machines. However, specialized sidecar engines are available to, like the 2-stroke engines from MTH (630cc) and Zabel (685cc). In the 2007 season, four out of the top-five used a VMC frame, including the world champion. Zabel provided the engines to the world champion and the runner-up. The only other engines found in the top ten were KTM and JAWA.
