= 2005 Sidecarcross World Championship =

Season
- Grands Prix: 11
- Duration: 17 April–25 September

Drivers
- Champions: (Netherlands) Daniël Willemsen (Belgium) Sven Verbrugge
- Sidecarcross des Nations: Latvia

The 2005 FIM Sidecarcross world championship, the 26th edition of the competition, started on 17 April and finished after eleven race weekends on 18 September 2005 with Daniël Willemsen taking out the title once more.

== Overview ==
The 2005 season was the 26th edition of the sidecarcross world championship. It resulted in a fourth world championship for Daniël Willemsen, his third in a row and his first with his passenger Sven Verbrugge from Belgium. The runners-up spot went to Kristers Sergis / Kaspars Stupelis who had a good start to the season and lead the classement in the early stages, the five-time world champion Sergis improving on last seasons disappointing seventh place. Third place also went to Latvia with Maris Rupeiks / Haralds Kurpnieks but the two were never in the race for the championship. Except for the top two, no other team managed to win a race this season.

The eleven races of the season were held in eight countries, Spain, Croatia, Bulgaria, Netherlands, France (2x), Germany (2x), Belgium and Latvia (2x).

== Format ==
Every Grand Prix weekend is split into two races, both held on the same day. This means, the 2005 season with its eleven Grand Prix had twentytwo races. Each race was 30 minutes plus 2 rounds long.

Teams go through a qualifying, usually on Saturday. Typically, around 50 teams compete for 30 spots on the starting grid, meaning around 20 teams miss out on the race altogether. Some teams did not actually get a race start all season, failing in qualifying each time.

Teams consist of a driver and a passenger, however, the drivers can and do exchange passengers during the season, often due to injury. An exchange of passenger does not affect the points a team has won up till then. Driver and passenger do not have to be from the same country either.

The first twenty teams of each race scored competition points, allocated accordingly to the following system:

| Place | Points |
|---|---|
| 1 | 25 |
| 2 | 22 |
| 3 | 20 |
| 4 | 18 |
| 5 | 16 |
| 6 | 15 |
| 7 | 14 |
| 8 | 13 |
| 9 | 12 |
| 10 | 11 |

| Place | Points |
|---|---|
| 11 | 10 |
| 12 | 9 |
| 13 | 8 |
| 14 | 7 |
| 15 | 6 |
| 16 | 5 |
| 17 | 4 |
| 18 | 3 |
| 19 | 2 |
| 20 | 1 |

== Calendar ==
The 2005 season had eleven Grand Prix:

| Date | Place | Race winners | GP winner |
| 17 April | (Spain) Talavera | (Netherlands) Daniel Willemsen / (Belgium) Sven Verbrugge | (Latvia) Kristers Sergis / Kaspars Stupelis |
| 17 April | (Spain) Talavera | (Latvia) Kristers Sergis / Kaspars Stupelis | (Latvia) Kristers Sergis / Kaspars Stupelis |
| 1 May | (Bulgaria) Sevlievo | (Latvia) Kristers Sergis / Kaspars Stupelis | (Latvia) Kristers Sergis / Kaspars Stupelis |
| 1 May | (Bulgaria) Sevlievo | (Latvia) Kristers Sergis / Kaspars Stupelis | (Latvia) Kristers Sergis / Kaspars Stupelis |
| 8 May | (Croatia) Zabok | (Netherlands) Daniel Willemsen / (Belgium) Sven Verbrugge | (Latvia) Kristers Sergis / Kaspars Stupelis |
| 8 May | (Croatia) Zabok | (Latvia) Kristers Sergis / Kaspars Stupelis | (Latvia) Kristers Sergis / Kaspars Stupelis |
| 29 May | (Netherlands) Halle | (Netherlands) Daniel Willemsen / (Belgium) Sven Verbrugge | (Netherlands) Daniel Willemsen / (Belgium) Sven Verbrugge |
| 29 May | (Netherlands) Halle | (Netherlands) Daniel Willemsen / (Belgium) Sven Verbrugge | (Netherlands) Daniel Willemsen / (Belgium) Sven Verbrugge |
| 5 June | (France) Brou | (Netherlands) Daniel Willemsen / (Belgium) Sven Verbrugge | (Netherlands) Daniel Willemsen / (Belgium) Sven Verbrugge |
| 5 June | (France) Brou | (Netherlands) Daniel Willemsen / (Belgium) Sven Verbrugge | (Netherlands) Daniel Willemsen / (Belgium) Sven Verbrugge |
| 10 July | (Latvia) Cēsis | (Netherlands) Daniel Willemsen / (Belgium) Sven Verbrugge | (Netherlands) Daniel Willemsen / (Belgium) Sven Verbrugge |
| 10 July | (Latvia) Cēsis | (Netherlands) Daniel Willemsen / (Belgium) Sven Verbrugge | (Netherlands) Daniel Willemsen / (Belgium) Sven Verbrugge |
| 17 July | (Belgium) Neeroeteren | (Netherlands) Daniel Willemsen / (Belgium) Sven Verbrugge | (Netherlands) Daniel Willemsen / (Belgium) Sven Verbrugge |
| 17 July | (Belgium) Neeroeteren | (Netherlands) Daniel Willemsen / (Belgium) Sven Verbrugge | (Netherlands) Daniel Willemsen / (Belgium) Sven Verbrugge |
| 31 July | (Germany) Reutlingen | (Netherlands) Daniel Willemsen / (Belgium) Sven Verbrugge | (Netherlands) Daniel Willemsen / (Belgium) Sven Verbrugge |
| 31 July | (Germany) Reutlingen | (Netherlands) Daniel Willemsen / (Belgium) Sven Verbrugge | (Netherlands) Daniel Willemsen / (Belgium) Sven Verbrugge |
| 21 August | (Latvia) Ķegums | (Netherlands) Daniel Willemsen / (Belgium) Sven Verbrugge | (Netherlands) Daniel Willemsen / (Belgium) Sven Verbrugge |
| 21 August | (Latvia) Ķegums | (Netherlands) Daniel Willemsen / (Belgium) Sven Verbrugge | (Netherlands) Daniel Willemsen / (Belgium) Sven Verbrugge |
| 11 September | (France) Dardon Gueugnon | (Latvia) Kristers Sergis / Kaspars Stupelis | (Latvia) Kristers Sergis / Kaspars Stupelis |
| 11 September | (France) Dardon Gueugnon | (Latvia) Kristers Sergis / Kaspars Stupelis | (Latvia) Kristers Sergis / Kaspars Stupelis |
| 18 September | (Germany) Rudersberg | (Netherlands) Daniel Willemsen / (Belgium) Sven Verbrugge | (Latvia) Kristers Sergis / Kaspars Stupelis |
| 18 September | (Germany) Rudersberg | (Latvia) Kristers Sergis / Kaspars Stupelis | (Latvia) Kristers Sergis / Kaspars Stupelis |
| 25 September | (Germany) Jauer | Latvia | |

- The Sidecarcross des Nations in Jauer on 25 September 2005 is a non-championship event but part of the calendar and is denoted by a light blue background in the table above.
- Passengers in italics.

== Classification ==
=== Riders ===
The final standings in the overall table of the 2005 season were:

| Position | Driver / Passenger | Equipment | Points | Wins | Second | Third |
| 1 | (Netherlands) Daniël Willemsen / (Belgium) Sven Verbrugge | Zabel-VMC | 478 | 15 | 4 | — |
| 2 | (Latvia) Kristers Serģis / Kaspars Stupelis | MTH-BSU | 440 | 7 | 12 | 1 |
| 3 | (Latvia) Māris Rupeiks / Haralds Kurpnieks | KTM-AYR | 317 | — | 1 | 6 |
| 4 | (Russia) Evgeny Scherbinin / Sergei Sosnovskikh | MTH-APZ | 299 | — | 3 | 4 |
| 5 | (Germany) Marko Happich / (Switzerland) Meinrad Schelbert / Sandro Michelotto | Zabel-VMC | 274 | — | — | 5 |
| 6 | (Netherlands) Jarno van den Boomen / Henry van de Wiel | MTH-BSU | 262 | — | — | 4 |
| 7 | (Belgium) Jan Hendrickx / Tim Smeunix / Ludo Somers / Alco van de Ketterij | MTH-BSU | 223 | — | — | — |
| 8 | (Belgium) Joris Hendrickx / Eli Piccart / Roger van de Lagemaat | MTH-BSU | 198 | — | — | — |
| 9 | (United Kingdom) Stuart Brown / Jason Peters / Marc Cooper | Zabel-VMC | 197 | — | 2 | — |
| 10 | (Germany) Werner Wittmann / (Czech Republic) Premysl Novotny | Zabel-AYR | 184 | — | — | 2 |
| 11 | (Czech Republic) Vaclav Rozehnal / Marek Rozehnal | Zabel-VMC | 175 | — | — | — |
| 12 | (Netherlands) Eric Schrijver / Christian Verhagen | MTH-VMC | 173 | — | — | — |
| 13 | (Netherlands) Marcel Willemsen / Bart Notten | KTM-VMC | 132 | — | — | — |
| 14 | (United Kingdom) John Watson / Mark Watson | Zabel-BSU | 126 | — | — | — |
| 15 | (Switzerland) Ulrich Müller / Reto Grütter | Kawasaki-VMC | 126 | — | — | — |
| 16 | (Belgium) Nicky Pulinx / (Switzerland) Bruno Kaelin / (Netherlands) Martijn Geerdink / (Belgium) Ludo Somers | KTM-VMC | 107 | — | — | — |
| 17 | (Czech Republic) Tomas Cermak / Ondrej Cermak | JAWA-VMC | 102 | — | — | — |
| 18 | (Germany) Josef Brustmann / Stefan Urich / (Netherlands) Alco van de Ketterij / (Switzerland) Bruno Kaelin | KTM-NMP | 100 | — | — | — |
| 19 | (Germany) Martin Walter / Andre Saam | Zabel-VMC | 98 | — | — | — |
| 20 | (Switzerland) Andy Burgler / Martin Betschart | KTM-VMC | 80 | — | — | — |
| 21 | (France) David Barat / Francis Blanco / (Germany) Marco Goldau | Zabel-VMC | 79 | — | — | — |
| 22 | (Netherlands) Carlo van Duijnhoven / Tom van Duijnhoven | MTH-VMC | 58 | — | — | — |
| 23 | (Sweden) Patrick Fagerberg / Daniel Fagerberg | KTM-Ayr | 58 | — | — | — |
| 24 | (Latvia) Jānis Daiders / Lauris Daiders | MTH-BSU | 51 | — | — | — |
| 25 | (United Kingdom) John Lyne / Colin Dunkley | Zabel-VMC | 51 | — | — | — |
| 26 | (Sweden) Henrik Söderqvist / Tobias Sylvan | Husaberg-VMC | 49 | — | — | — |
| 27 | (Netherlands) Thijs Derks / Roy Derks | Husaberg-BSU | 49 | — | — | — |
| 28 | (Belgium) Geert Devoldere / (France) Herve Allier / (Germany) Juregen Hulsmans / (France) Joel Bequillard | Honda-EML | 40 | — | — | — |
| 29 | (Belgium) Kristof Santermans / Stefan Coeck / (Netherlands) Patrick Nieuwenhuizen | Yamaha-VMC | 38 | — | — | — |
| 30 | (Belgium) Boudewijn Gommeren / Bart Verbrugge | KTM-AYR | 34 | — | — | — |
| 31 | (Germany) Frank Hofman / (Belgium) Ludo Somers | Zabel-VMC | 33 | — | — | — |
| 32 | (France) Jean Marie Ains / Bernard Jayet | Zabel-VMC | 26 | — | — | — |
| 33 | (France) Johnny Bethis / Charlie Begaud | Zabel-VMC | 25 | — | — | — |
| 34 | (Latvia) Alvis Tribockis / Mario Kirilko | MTH-VMC | 18 | — | — | — |
| 35 | (Netherlands) Johan Smit / Gertie Eggink | Zabel-BSU | 16 | — | — | — |
| 36 | (Netherlands) Maikel Kuster / Wilfried Keuben | Zabel-VMC | 13 | — | — | — |
| 37 | (Netherlands) Marcel Grondman / Martijn Geerdink / Clemens Grondman | Zabel-VMC | 13 | — | — | — |
| 38 | (Lithuania) Imantas Tamuliūnas / Egidijus Karaliūnas | KTM-BSU | 12 | — | — | — |
| 39 | (Estonia) Andrus Vaks / Raimo Kaul | KTM-AYR | 12 | — | — | — |
| 40 | (United Kingdom) Scott Wilkinson / Gary Burt | Zabel-VMC | 12 | — | — | — |
| 41 | (Estonia) Argo Poldsaar / Tonu Handsar | MTH-AYR | 12 | — | — | — |
| 42 | (Netherlands) Wim Janssen / Henk Roenhorst | Zabel-BSU | 11 | — | — | — |
| 43 | (France) Michael Poirier / Edouard Cherau | Zabel-VMC | 10 | — | — | — |
| 44 | (France) David Surcin / Landry Tessier | Zabel-VMC | 10 | — | — | — |
| 45 | (Germany) Jens Bochmann / Stefan Progscha | Zabel-AYR | 9 | — | — | — |
| 46 | (Netherlands) Patrick Greup / Peter Holleman | KTM-VMC | 8 | — | — | — |
| 47 | (Germany) Jürgen Blank / Rainer Semet | Zabel-VMC | 6 | — | — | — |
| 48 | (France) Baptiste Bigand / Julien Bigand | MTH-AYR | 5 | — | — | — |
| 49 | (Germany) Willie Liebel/ (Czech Republic) Vaclav Hotovy | MEFO-VMC | 3 | — | — | — |
| 50 | (United Kingdom) Stuart Lines / Michael Stones | KTM-VMC | 3 | — | — | — |
| 51 | (Belgium) Andreas Clohse / Guido Schlabertz | Zabel-VMC | 3 | — | — | — |
| 52 | (Germany) Dietmar Schmid / Marco Godau | KTM-AYR | 2 | — | — | — |
| 53 | (Estonia) Serge Ivanov / Atho Jalas | KTM-AYR | 1 | — | — | — |
| 54 | (France) Herve Boursaud / Guennady Auvray | KTM-VMC | 1 | — | — | — |

- Equipment listed is motor and frame.
- Some drivers used more than one passenger during the season. Where there are more than one passenger shown, they are in the order of races they have taken part in with this driver.
