= Marko Happich =

German former sidecarcross rider (born 1971)

- Nationality: German
- Born: 1971 (age 54–55)
- Website: Official website
Motorcycle racing career statistics
Sidecarcross World Championship
Active years	1996 - 2012
Manufacturers	MTH-EML (1996–2000) Zabel-VMC (2001–2007) Zabel-MEFO (2008–2010) Zabel-VMC (2011–2012)
Championships	none
2012 championship position	18
Starts / Wins / Podiums / Poles / F. laps / Points; 293 / 4 / 41 / / / 3,449

Marko Happich (born 1971) is a German former sidecarcross rider. Internationally, his greatest success was a runners-up finish in the Sidecarcross World Championship, achieved in 2004, while domestically, he has won six national German Sidecarcross Championships.

After twenty years in the sidecarcross sport, Happich retired at the end of the 2012 season.

== Racing career ==
=== German Championship ===
Happich first entered the German national championship in 1994 with passenger Peer Kasseckert, also winning the German sidecarcross cup, a second-string competition, in 1994. Happich soon achieved top-ten finishes and won his first national championship in 2001, with Sebastian Böhme as his passenger.

For the next decade, Happich became one of the dominant drivers in the national championship, winning titles in 2001, 2003, 2004, 2006, 2008 and 2009 while finishing runners-up in 2002, 2007, 2010 and 2011. In the last two instances, Happich missed out on the national title by just one point. He had his most dominant season in 2004 when he, with Thomas Weinmann as his passenger who himself had already won five German titles alongside his brother Klaus, won 14 out of 16 season races in the competition. Apart from Böhme (2001) and Weinmann (2004), Happich won his other four titles with Gertain Wijs (2003), Meinrad Schelbert (2006, 2008) and Martin Betschart (2009) as his passengers. From 2007 onwards, the national German championship became an international one, allowing non-German riders to win it and increasing competition, resulting in Swiss rider Andy Bürgler finishing ahead of runners-up Happich that season. He officially retired from all competition at the end of the 2012 season.

Happich made an on-off return to the German Championship in 2014, racing in Geisleden in May 2014, coming fourth in the first race but suffering a flat tire in the second.

=== World Championship ===
Entering the Sidecarcross World Championship from 1996, Happich slowly improved in the competition over the years and earned his first top-ten finish in 2000. For the next ten seasons, from 2000 to 2009 Happich finished in the top-ten every year, culminating in a second place in 2004 as his best-ever result. He also won two Grand Prix that season, in Croatia and Latvia, but never truly challenged for the World Championship, finishing 153 points behind eventual winners Daniel Willemsen and Kaspars Stupelis.

Happich once more finished in the top-three in 2006, now in third place and managed to win a third and final Grand Prix in Belgium 2009. His final three seasons in the competition were less successful, coming 15th, eighth and 18th and taking out his last race win in Rudersberg, Germany, in 2010.

Happich announced his intention to retire at the end of 2012 before the start of the new season, citing his amateur status when the top riders were all professionals, his age and the difficulty to raise a six-digit budget each season through sponsors as his reasons. His final season was affected by a shoulder injury, missing a number of mid-season Grand Prix but returning in time for the last event of the season.

== Private life ==
Happich lives in Großwilsdorf, near Naumburg, where he works as a swim instructor at a local pool. He is a member of the local motocross club MSC Teutschenthal, based in Teutschenthal.

In 2006, Happich lost a downhill race against Austrian skier Stephan Eberharter at Obertauern as part of the German television show Wetten, dass..?, the race being broadcast live on television. Eberharter skied down while Happich raced down in his sidecarcross, losing by just under one second.

== Season by season ==
The season by season results in the World Championship for Marko Happich:

Season	Passenger	Equipment	Position	Points	Races	Wins	Second	Third
1996	Peer Kasseckert	MTH-EML	47	1	1	—	—	—
1997	Beat Meyer	MTH-EML	26	17	5	—	—	—
1998	Beat Meyer	MTH-EML	16	62	16	—	—	—
1999	Sebastian Böhme	MTH-EML	17	61	16	—	—	—
2000	Sebastian Böhme Tobias Sylwan	MTH-EML	10	107	14	—	—	—
2001	Sebastian Böhme	Zabel-VMC	9	170	19	—	—	—
2002	Sebastian Böhme Gertain Wijs	Zabel-VMC	5	343	26	—	—	—
2003	Gertain Wijs	Zabel-VMC	7	301	22	—	—	2
2004	Thomas Weinmann	Zabel-VMC	2	419	23	1	8	6
2005	Meinrat Schelbert Sandro Michelotto	Zabel-VMC	5	274	18	—	—	5
2006	Meinrat Schelbert Mark Watson	Zabel-VMC	3	243	14	1	1	2
2007	Meinrat Schelbert	Zabel-VMC	7	180	16	—	1	1
2008	Meinrat Schelbert	Zabel-MEFO	5	317	24	—	1	3
2009	Martin Betschart	Zabel-MEFO	4	377	24	1	3	1
2010	Martin Betschart	Zabel-MEFO	15	177	19	1	—	1
2011	Meinrat Schelbert	Zabel-VMC	8	317	26	—	—	2
2012	Martin Betschart	Zabel-VMC	18	83	10	—	—	—
Overall 1996 – 2012				3,449	293	4	14	23

=== Key ===
1	World Champions
2	Runners-up
3	Third placed
4 – 10	Driver finished fourth to tenth

== Honours ==
- Sidecarcross World Championship
  - Runners-up: 2004
- German national Sidecarcross Championship
  - Winners: (7) 2001, 2003, 2004, 2006, 2008, 2009
  - Runners-up: (4) 2002, 2007, 2010, 2011

Sporting positions
Preceded by Klaus Weinmann	German national sidecarcross champion 2001	Succeeded by Klaus Weinmann
Preceded by Klaus Weinmann	German national sidecarcross champion 2003–2004	Succeeded by Josef Brustmann
Preceded by Josef Brustmann	German national sidecarcross champion 2006	Succeeded by Andy Bürgler
Preceded by Andy Bürgler	German national sidecarcross champion 2008–2009	Succeeded by Peter Steegmanns
