= 2012 Sidecarcross World Championship =

Motorcycle race in 2012

Season
- Grands Prix: 11
- Duration: 1 April 2012–16 September 2012

Drivers
- Champions: (Netherlands) Daniël Willemsen (Netherlands) Kenny van Gaalen
- Sidecarcross des Nations: Netherlands

The 2012 FIM Sidecarcross World Championship, the 33rd edition of the competition, started on 1 April and finished after eleven race weekends on 16 September 2012.

The defending champions were Daniël Willemsen from the Netherlands and his Belgian passenger Sven Verbrugge. Willemsen and Verbrugge were a team for a fifth time in the history of the competition, with the combination previously winning the 2005 and 2006 titles together. However, the two were racing in separate teams in 2012, with Willemsen having used three different passengers during the season because of injury woes, while Sven Verbrugge joined fellow Belgian pilot Ben Adriaenssen.

Parallel to the riders competition, a manufacturers championship is also held. The defending champions in the manufacturers competition were VMC but the 2012 edition was won by WSP, the manufacturers second title after 2010.

The final race of the 2012 season was held on 16 September at Rudersberg, Germany. The competition was won by Daniël Willemsen, for the tenth time, and his passenger Lauris Daiders who took over competition leadership from Etienne Bax and Kaspars Stupelis after the Russian Grand Prix and sealed the championship in the final race by a margin of five points, the third-lowest in competition history. Daiders however was not the official world champion as he has taken part in less than the required 50 percent of the races and earned less than the required 50 percent of points on Willemsen's side, this honor going to Kenny van Gaalen instead.

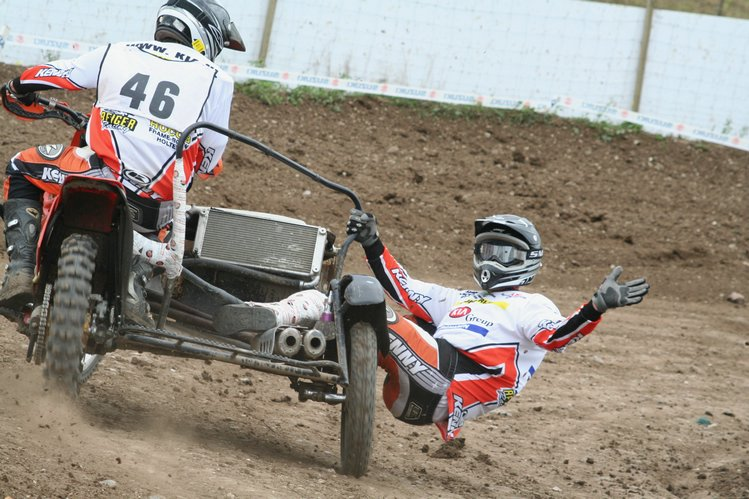
Sidecarcross passenger in action

The Sidecarcross World Championship, first held in 1980 and organised by the Fédération Internationale de Motocyclisme, is an annual competition. All races, manufacturers and the vast majority of riders in the competition being in and from Europe. Sidecarcross is similar to motocross except that the teams consist of two riders, a driver and a passenger. Races are held on the same tracks as solo motocross but the handling of the machines differs as sidecars don't lean. The majority of physical work in the sport is carried out by the passenger, who speeds up the sidecarcross in corners by leaning out. The coordination between the driver and the passenger are therefore of highest importance.

== Overview ==
The eleven races of the season were held in nine countries, France (two races), Netherlands, Germany (two races), Czech Republic, Belgium, Estonia, Russia, Latvia and Switzerland. In comparison to the 2011 edition, the Grand Prix of Poland, Ukraine and Denmark have been dropped off the calendar while the Czech GP made a return.

== Format ==
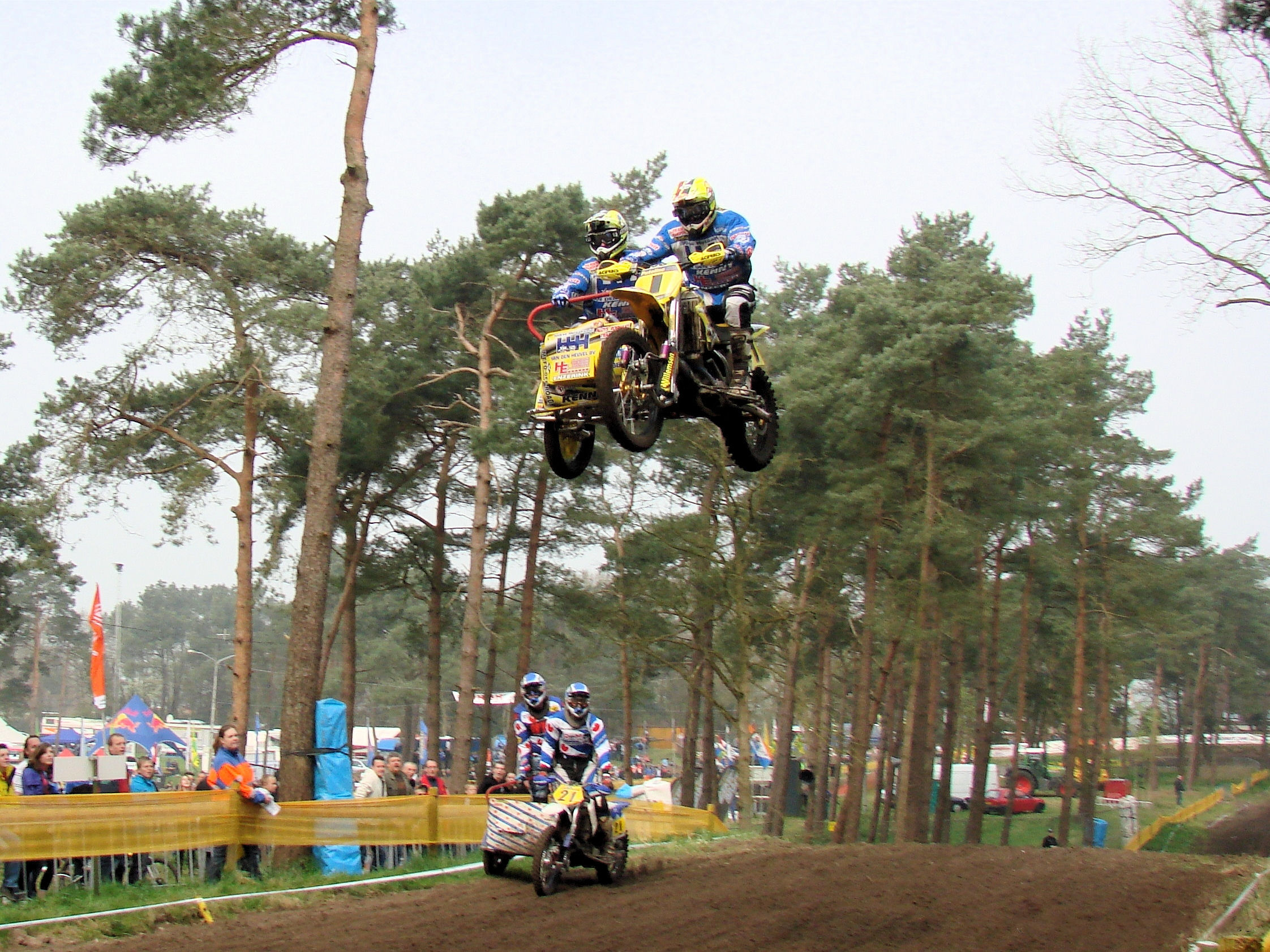
Defending champion Daniël Willemsen in action in 2009.

Every Grand Prix weekend is split into two races, both held on the same day. This means, the 2012 season with its eleven Grand Prix had 22 races. Each race lasts for 30 minutes plus two laps. The two races on a weekend actually get combined to determine an overall winner. In case of a tie, the results of the second race as used to determine the winner. While this overall winner receives no extra WC points, they usually are awarded a special trophy. Race start times are set at 13:30 and 16:00.

Events typically consist of a qualifying competition, held in multiple stages on Saturdays of a race weekend while the two race events are typically held on Sundays. One exception to this rule is Easter weekends, when the races are held on Easter Monday. Race weekends can consist of additional motocross or quart support races as well, but the FIM stipulates that the World Championship races have priority. Riders have to be provided with at least one 30 minute free practice season, which will be timed. A race can consist of up to 30 starters and the qualifying modus is dependent on the number of entries. Up to 32 entries, it will be held in one group split into two sessions of 30 minutes each. Above 32 entries, the starter field will be sub-divided into two groups through ballot and the current standings. Each qualifying group can consist of up to 30 racers. Should there be more than 60 entries, a pre-qualifying has to be held. Of the riders in the two groups, the top-twelve directly qualify for the races. The remaining teams then go to a second-chance qualifying, in which the best six advance. The riders placed seventh and eighth remain in reserve should one of the qualified teams not be able to participate.

The FIM stipulates that all drivers must be of a minimum age of 18 while passengers have to be at least 16 years old to compete, but no older than 50. Riders older than 50 have to provide a certificate of medical fitness to be permitted to compete. The driver has the right to exchange his passenger under certain conditions.

Starting numbers for the season are awarded according to the previous seasons overall finishing position of the driver. Current or former World Champions have however the right to pick any number they wish, except the number one which is reserved for the current World Champion.

The competition is open for motor cycles with two-stroke engines from between 350 and 750cc and four-stroke engines of up to 1,000cc. Each team is permitted the use of two motorcycles with the possibility of changing machines between races.

The FIM does not permit radio communication between riders and their teams. Outside assistance during the race on the course is not permitted unless it is through race marshals in the interest of safety. Limited repairs in the designated repair zone during the race are permitted.

The first twenty teams of each race score competition points. The point system for the 2012 season is as follows:

Place	Points
1	25
2	22
3	20
4	18
5	16
6	15
7	14
8	13
9	12
10	11

Place	Points
11	10
12	9
13	8
14	7
15	6
16	5
17	4
18	3
19	2
20	1

== Prize money ==
In 2012 prize money was awarded to all rider scoring points, with €300 going to each race winner, €250 to the runners-up, gradually declining from there, with €50 going to all teams placed 12th to 20th. Additionally, every team qualified for the race plus the two reserve teams receive €500 in travel compensation.

== Retirements ==
At the end of the 2012 season a number of long-term competitors retired from the competition, the most successful of those being Belgian Joris Hendrickx, World Champion in 2009 and active since 2003, German Marko Happich, runners-up in 2004 and active since 1996, and Belgian passenger Sven Verbrugge, World Champion in 2005, 2006 and 2011 and active since 1993.

== Calendar ==
The official calendar for the 2012 season:

Date	Place	Race winners	GP winner	Source
1 April	(France) Pernes-les-Fontaines	(Belgium) Joris Hendrickx / Kaspars Liepiņš	(Belgium) Joris Hendrickx / Kaspars Liepiņš	Result
1 April	(France) Pernes-les-Fontaines	(Belgium) Jan Hendrickx / Tim Smeuninx	(Belgium) Joris Hendrickx / Kaspars Liepiņš	Result
9 April	(Netherlands) Oldebroek	(Netherlands) Daniël Willemsen / Kenny van Gaalen	(Netherlands) Daniël Willemsen / Kenny van Gaalen	Result
9 April	(Netherlands) Oldebroek	(Netherlands) Etienne Bax / Kaspars Stupelis	(Netherlands) Daniël Willemsen / Kenny van Gaalen	Result
20 May	(Germany) Reutlingen	(Netherlands) Etienne Bax / Kaspars Stupelis	(Netherlands) Etienne Bax / Kaspars Stupelis	Result
20 May	(Germany) Reutlingen	(Netherlands) Daniël Willemsen / Kenny van Gaalen	(Netherlands) Etienne Bax / Kaspars Stupelis	Result
10 June	(Czech Republic) Kramolín	(Netherlands) Etienne Bax / Kaspars Stupelis	(Netherlands) Etienne Bax / Kaspars Stupelis	Result
10 June	(Czech Republic) Kramolín	(Netherlands) Etienne Bax / Kaspars Stupelis	(Netherlands) Etienne Bax / Kaspars Stupelis	Result
8 July	(Belgium) Genk	(Netherlands) Daniël Willemsen / Kenny van Gaalen	(Netherlands) Daniël Willemsen / Kenny van Gaalen	Result
8 July	(Belgium) Genk	(Netherlands) Daniël Willemsen / Kenny van Gaalen	(Netherlands) Daniël Willemsen / Kenny van Gaalen	Result
15 July	(France) Lacapelle-Marival	(Netherlands) Daniël Willemsen / Kenny van Gaalen	(Netherlands) Etienne Bax / Kaspars Stupelis	Result
15 July	(France) Lacapelle-Marival	(Netherlands) Etienne Bax / Kaspars Stupelis	(Netherlands) Etienne Bax / Kaspars Stupelis	Result
29 July	(Estonia) Kiviõli	(Netherlands) Etienne Bax / Kaspars Stupelis	(Netherlands) Daniël Willemsen / Lauris Daiders	Result
29 July	(Estonia) Kiviõli	(Netherlands) Daniël Willemsen / Lauris Daiders	(Netherlands) Daniël Willemsen / Lauris Daiders	Result
5 August	(Russia) Kamensk	(Netherlands) Daniël Willemsen / Lauris Daiders	(Netherlands) Daniël Willemsen / Lauris Daiders	Result
5 August	(Russia) Kamensk	(Netherlands) Daniël Willemsen / Lauris Daiders	(Netherlands) Daniël Willemsen / Lauris Daiders	Result
12 August	(Latvia) Ķegums	(Netherlands) Daniël Willemsen / Lauris Daiders	(Netherlands) Etienne Bax / Kaspars Stupelis	Result
12 August	(Latvia) Ķegums	(Netherlands) Etienne Bax / Kaspars Stupelis	(Netherlands) Etienne Bax / Kaspars Stupelis	Result
26 August	(Switzerland) Roggenburg	(Netherlands) Daniël Willemsen / Lauris Daiders	(Netherlands) Daniël Willemsen / Lauris Daiders	Result
26 August	(Switzerland) Roggenburg	(Netherlands) Daniël Willemsen / Lauris Daiders	(Netherlands) Daniël Willemsen / Lauris Daiders	Result
16 September	(Germany) Rudersberg	(Netherlands) Etienne Bax / Kaspars Stupelis	(Netherlands) Etienne Bax / Kaspars Stupelis	Result
16 September	(Germany) Rudersberg	(Netherlands) Etienne Bax / Kaspars Stupelis	(Netherlands) Etienne Bax / Kaspars Stupelis	Result
23 September	(Netherlands) Oss	Netherlands		

- The Sidecarcross des Nations is a non-championship event but part of the calendar and is denoted by a light blue background in the table above.
- Flags for passengers not shown.

== Classification ==
=== Riders ===
The top ten teams in the final overall standings were:

Position	Driver / Passenger	Equipment	Bike No	Points
1	(Netherlands) Daniël Willemsen / Kenny van Gaalen ^{‡}	Zabel-WSP	1	452
2	(Netherlands) Etienne Bax / (Latvia) Kaspars Stupelis	Zabel-WSP	5	447
3	(Belgium) Ben Adriaenssen / Sven Verbrugge	KTM-WSP	6	385
4	(Belgium) Joris Hendrickx / (Latvia) Kaspars Liepiņš	KTM-VMC	222	369
5	(Belgium) Jan Hendrickx / Tim Smeuninx	Zabel-VMC	3	369
6	(France) Valentin Giraud / Nicolas Musset	KTM-WHT	138	334
7	(Czech Republic) Vaclav Rozehnal / Marek Rozehnal	Zabel-VMC	11	240
8	(Netherlands) Marcel Willemsen / Gertie Eggink	Zabel-MEFO	21	223
9	(Latvia) Māris Rupeiks / Elvijs Mucenieks	Zabel-WSP	4	194
10	(Switzerland) Andy Bürgler / (Germany) Raphael Markert	KTM-VMC	14	188

- ^{‡} Willemsen used Haralds Kurpnieks as his passenger in the first Grand Prix of the season, Kenny van Gaalen in the following five Grand Prix and Lauris Daiders in the remaining. Kurpnieks suffered a broken wrist in the opening GP while van Gaalen injured his knee in the second French GP, both being sidelined for lengthy periods of time.

=== Manufacturers ===
Parallel to the riders championship, a manufacturers competition was also held. In every race, only the best-placed rider of every make was awarded points in this competition.

The final standings in the manufacturers competition were:

Position	Manufacturer	Points
1	WSP	544
2	VMC	444
3	WHT	340
4	KTM	15
5	Husaberg	5
6	BSU	0
