= Gertie Eggink =

Dutch sidecarcross rider

- Nationality: Netherlands
- Born: October 21, 1980 (age 46); Netherlands
- Bike number: 17
Motorcycle racing career statistics
Sidecarcross World Championship
Active years	2004 - 2005 2008 - present
Manufacturers	Zabel-BSU (2005) Husaberg-VMC(2008) KTM-VMC (2009) Zabel-WSP (2010-2011) Zabel-MEFO (2012) Zabel-WSP (2013-present)
Championships	(1) 2010
2014 championship position	10th
Starts / Wins / Podiums / Poles / F. laps / Points; 115 / 14 / 20 / / / 1,121

Gertie Eggink (born 21 February 1980) is a Dutch sidecarcross rider and the 2010 Sidecarcross World Champion, riding as passenger with Daniël Willemsen.

Like the Willemsen brothers Daniël and Marcel, Eggink hails from Lochem, Gelderland.

== Biography ==
Eggink started racing in the world championship from 2004 onwards with a variety of riders.

Eggink raced the 2010 season with multiple world champion Daniël Willemsen after the later had an unsuccessful 2009 season, only coming fifth, suffering a broken collar bone that made him miss some races. Eggink raced with Willemsen in 12 of the 14 Grand Prix of the season, winning 14 races and three Grand Prix. In the last two races of the season however, Willemsen had to replace Eggink with Dagwin Sabbe as Eggink was advised by his doctor not to race in the final GP's. In a tight season the pair eventually won the world championship by nine points, ahead of defending champions Joris Hendrickx and Kaspars Liepiņš. Eggink, after the race in Poland, lost consciousness and, completely exhausted, had to be taken to hospital. Eggink suffered health problems throughout the seasons which were eventually diagnosed as virus in his blood.

In 2011 and 2012, Eggink was racing with Marcel Willemsen, the younger brother of Daniël Willemsen, achieving good results and sitting in the top ten of the competition in 2012 after coming 21st in 2011, in a difficult season that saw the Marcel brake three rips and bruise his neck, and saw them suffering financial setbacks through engine trouble.

In the 2013 season, Eggink only took part in one event of the GP season, the first race of the Belgian GP, where he, as the passenger of Marcel Willemsen. The pair entered five Grand Prix in 2014 and came 20th overall.

=== Season by season ===
The season-by-season results for Gertie Eggink in the world championship:

Season	Passenger	Equipment	Position	Points	Races	Wins	Second	Third
2004	(Germany) Mario Hartmann		52	3	4	—	—	—
2005	(Netherlands) Johan Smit	Zabel-BSU	35	16	10	—	—	—
2008	(Netherlands) Thijs Derks	Husaberg-VMC	13	158	12	—	1	—
2009	(Netherlands) Gerrit van Werven	KTM-VMC	16	113	21	—	—	—
2010	(Netherlands) Daniël Willemsen	Zabel-WSP	1	481	24	14	1	3
2011	(Netherlands) Marcel Willemsen	Zabel-WSP	21	58	12	—	—	—
2012	(Netherlands) Marcel Willemsen	Zabel-MEFO	8	223	22	—	1	—
2013	(Netherlands) Marcel Willemsen	Zabel-WSP	39	10	1	—	—	—
2014	(Netherlands) Marcel Willemsen	Zabel-WSP	20	59	9	—	—	—
Overall 2004 - 2014				1,121	115	14	3	3

== Honours ==
=== World Championship ===
- Champions: 2010

Sporting positions
Preceded by Kaspars Liepiņš	Sidecarcross World Champion (passenger); 2010	Succeeded by Sven Verbrugge
