= Kaspars Liepiņš =

Latvian motorcycle racer

- Nationality: Latvia
- Born: 11 October 1984 (age 42); Cēsis, Soviet Union
- Bike number: 222
- Website: Official website
Motorcycle racing career statistics
Sidecarcross World Championship
Active years	2007 - present
Manufacturers	KTM-AYR (2007-2008); KTM-VMC (2009-present)
2012 championship position	4th
Starts / Wins / Podiums / Poles / F. laps / Points; 124 / 11 / 64 / / / 2,131

Kaspars Liepiņš (born 11 October 1984 in Cēsis) is a Latvian sidecarcross rider and the 2009 World Champion, won as the passenger of the Belgian Joris Hendrickx.

As Hendrickx's passenger, Liepiņš is also a three-time Belgian national sidecarcross champion, having won titles in 2008, 2009 and 2010, and the 2013 French and 2015 German champion.

== Sidecarcross results ==
Liepiņš took part in sidecarcross races in the national Latvian championship from 2003, at first as passenger for U. Zvaigznītis, and, from 2004, on the side of Kārlis Leimanis.

Liepiņš made his world championship debut on 9 April 2007, in the first race of the season, alongside fellow Latvian Kārlis Leimanis. In their first race, they finished only 26th but managed to win three points in race two of the event, the Dutch GP at Oldebroek. The duo took part in the first four of eight events that season, with a sixteenth place their best result and an overall finish of 33rd.

The following season, Liepiņš teamed up with Joris Hendrickx and earned considerably more success, coming fourth overall and winning the Belgian national championship.

The 2009 season was initially dominated by Daniël Willemsen, who had won the previous six world championships. When Willemsen missed a number of races because of injury, Jan Hendrickx took the lead in the competition. At the German GP at Strassbessenbach, Hendrickx/Liepiņš took out their first race win and also their first Grand Prix victory. With one event, the GP at Rudersberg, to go, Joris Hendrickx and Kaspars Liepins were 13 points behind the leaders Jan Hendrickx / Tim Smeuninx, in second place, but the leading combination suffered an engine defect in round four of the first race in Germany and lost all its advantage. A win and a second place in the last event earned the Belgian / Latvian combination the world title, with Joris Hendrickx becoming only the second Belgian to do so, after Sven Verbrugge, and the first Belgian driver to record this achievement. Kaspars Liepiņš, in turn, is the fourth Latvian with world championship honours in the sport.

The Belgian-Latvian combination Hendrickx-Liepiņš suffered a season-ending injury at the qualifying of the German Grand Prix in July 2011, being able to compete in the race but requiring surgery afterwards. Consequently, the team only finished ninth in the overall standings at the end of the season.

The team was able to complete the 2012 season without injury and finished fourth in the world championship, 83 points behind Daniël Willemsen who won his tenth title. In November 2012, Joris Hendrickx retired from the sport, initially leaving Liepiņš to look for a new team. Despite his announced retirement, Hendrickx still took part in non-GP sidecarcross races together with Liepiņš, the pair winning the event in Muri, Switzerland in 2013. Hendrickx also declared that he would start at the Belgian and French GP's in 2013, but did not compete in either event. Instead, Hendrickx and Liepiņš raced the French national championship which they won.

In the 2014 season, Liepiņš competed in only a few selected races of the French championship, still as passenger of Hendrickx, but still as a top contender. The following season the pair won the German championship.

=== Season by season ===
Kaspars Liepiņš sidecarcross world championship statistics:

Season	Driver	Equipment	Position	Points	Races	Wins	Second	Third
2007	(Latvia) Kārlis Leimanis	KTM-AYR	33	17	8	—	—	—
2008	(Belgium) Joris Hendrickx	KTM-AYR	4	394	24	—	2	2
2009	(Belgium) Joris Hendrickx	KTM-VMC	1	483	26	2	7	10
2010	(Belgium) Joris Hendrickx	KTM-VMC	2	547	28	6	12	2
2011	(Belgium) Joris Hendrickx	KTM-VMC	9	315	16	2	6	2
2012	(Belgium) Joris Hendrickx	KTM-VMC	4	369	22	1	3	7
	Overall 2007 - 2012			2,131	124	11	30	23

Source:"The worldwide source for information about the wild sport of Sidecar Motocross racing".

- Passengers in italics.

== Honours ==
=== World Championship ===
- Champions: (1) 2009
- Runners-up: (1) 2010

=== Belgium ===
- Champions: (3) 2008, 2009, 2010

=== France ===
- Champions: (1) 2013

=== Germany ===
- Champions: (1) 2015

Sporting positions
Preceded by Reto Grütter	Sidecarcross World Champion (passenger); 2009	Succeeded by Gertie Eggink
Preceded by Reto Grütter	Belgian national sidecarcross champion (passenger); 2008–2010	Succeeded by Tim Smeuninx
Preceded by Bertrand Poirier	French national sidecarcross champion (passenger); 2013	Succeeded by Nicolas Musset
Preceded by Martin Betschart	German national sidecarcross champion (passenger); 2015	Incumbent
