= 2010 Sidecarcross World Championship =

Motorcycle race in 2010

Season
- Grands Prix: 14
- Duration: 5 April–12 September

Drivers
- Champions: (Netherlands) Daniël Willemsen (Netherlands) Gertie Eggink
- Sidecarcross des Nations: Netherlands

The 2010 FIM Sidecarcross World Championship, the 31st edition of the sidecarcross competition, started on 5 April and finished after fourteen race weekends on 12 September 2010.

The defending champions were Joris Hendrickx from Belgium and Kaspars Liepins from Latvia. The championship was won by Daniël Willemsen from the Netherlands, his eighth title, with his compatriot Gertie Eggink as his passenger. In the final two races of the season, Willemsen used Dagwin Sabbe as his passenger, replacing Eggink.

Parallel to the riders competition, a manufacturers championship was also held, which was won by WSP, with VMC coming second.

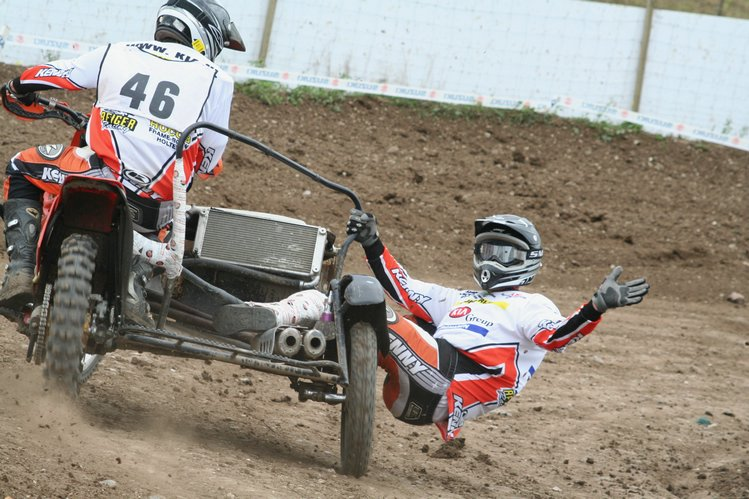
Sidecarcross passenger in action

The Sidecarcross World Championship, first held in 1980 and organised by the Fédération Internationale de Motocyclisme, is an annual competition. All races, manufacturers and the vast majority of riders in the competition being in and from Europe. Sidecarcross is similar to motocross except that the teams consist of two riders, a driver and a passenger. Races are held on the same tracks as solo motocross but the handling of the machines differs as sidecars don't lean. The majority of physical work in the sport is carried out by the passenger, who speeds up the sidecarcross in corners by leaning out. The coordination between the driver and the passenger are therefore of highest importance.

== Overview ==
The fourteen races of the season were held in twelve countries, Netherlands, Great Britain, France, Italy, Poland, Ukraine, Belgium, Germany, Estonia, Latvia, Russia and Denmark. It was the first time since 2001, that the championship returned to Great Britain. Italy was last on the calendar in 2008, the other ten countries all hosted races in 2009, too. The Swiss GP, which was held for the first time since 2001 in 2009, was again dropped from the schedule.

== Format ==
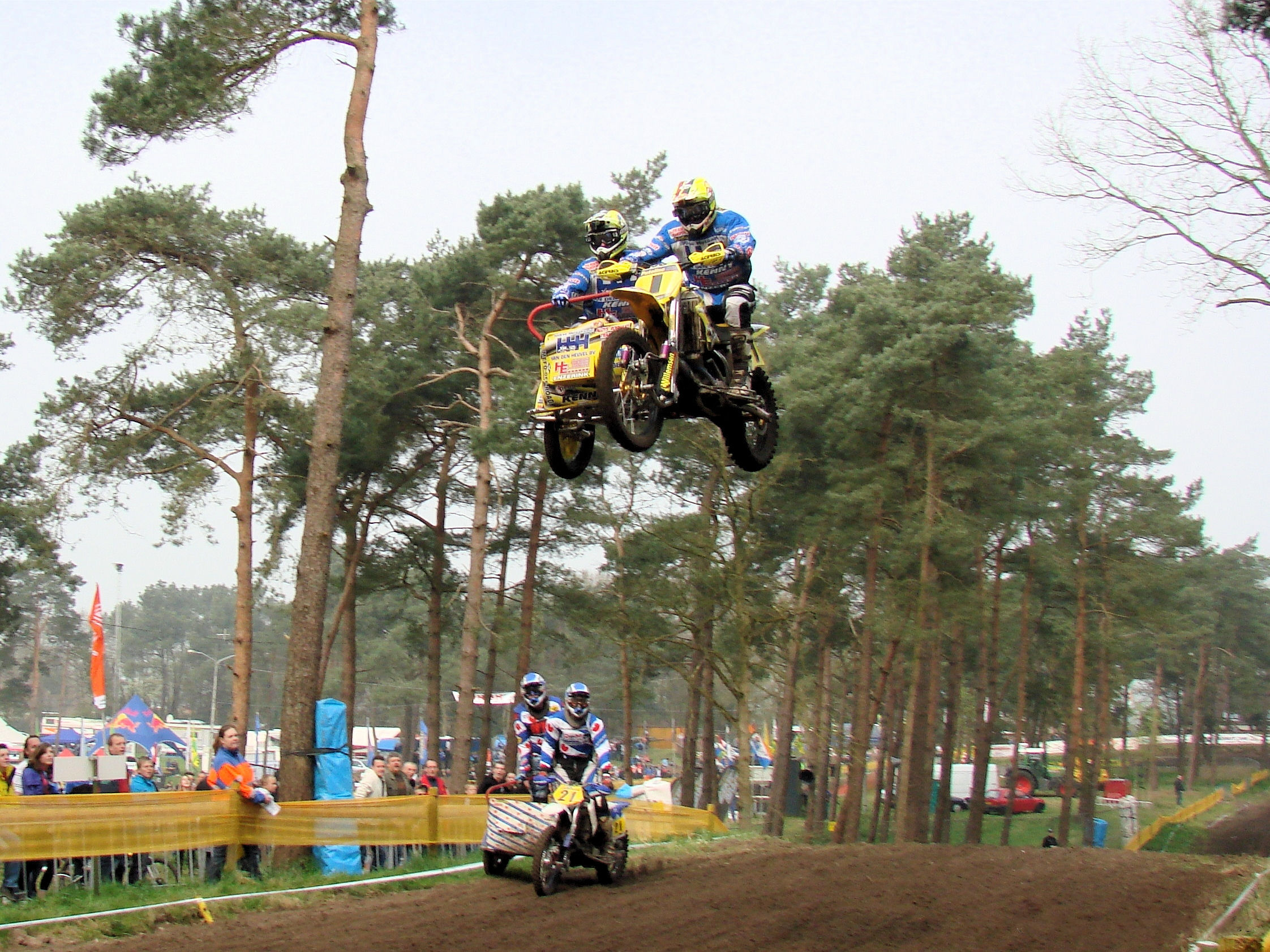
The 2010 champion Daniël Willemsen in action in 2009.

Every Grand Prix weekend is split into two races, both held on the same day. This means, the 2011 season with its thirteen Grand Prix has 26 races. Each race lasts for 30 minutes plus two laps. The two races on a weekend actually get combined to determine an overall winner. In case of a tie, the results of the second race as used to determined the winner. While this overall winners receives no extra WC points, they usually are awarded a special trophy. Race start times are set at 13:30 and 16:00.

Events typically consist of a qualifying competition, held in multiple stages on Saturdays of a race weekend while the two race events are typically held on Sundays. One exception to this rule is Easter weekends, when the races are held on Easter Monday. Race weekends can consist of additional motocross or quart support races as well, but the FIM stipulates that the World Championship races have priority. Riders have to be provided with at least one 30 minute free practice season, which will be timed. A race can consist of up to 30 starters and the qualifying modus is dependent on the number of entries. Up to 32 entries, it will be held in one group split into two sessions of 30 minutes each. Above 32 entries, the starter field will be sub-divided into two groups through ballot and the current standings. Each qualifying group can consist of up to 30 racers. Should there be more than 60 entries, a pre-qualifying has to be held. Of the riders in the two groups, the top-twelve directly qualify for the races. The remaining teams then go to a second-chance qualifying, in which the best six advance. The riders placed seventh and eighth remain in reserve should one of the qualified teams not be able to participate.

The FIM stipulates that all drivers must be of a minimum age of 18 while passengers have to be at least 16 years old to compete, but no older than 50. Riders older than 50 have to provide a certificate of medical fitness to be permitted to compete. The driver has the right to exchange his passenger under certain conditions.

Starting numbers for the season are awarded according to the previous seasons overall finishing position of the driver. Current or former World Champions have however the right to pick any number they wish, except the number one which is reserved for the current World Champion.

The competition is open for motor cycles with two-stroke engines from between 350 and 750cc and four-stroke engines of up to 1,000cc. Each team is permitted the use of two motorcycles with the possibility of changing machines between races.

The FIM does not permit radio communication between riders and their teams. Outside assistance during the race on the course is not permitted unless it is through race marshals in the interest of safety. Limited repairs in the designated repair zone during the race are permitted.

The first twenty teams of each race score competition points. The point system for the 2010 season is as follows:

Place	Points
1	25
2	22
3	20
4	18
5	16
6	15
7	14
8	13
9	12
10	11

Place	Points
11	10
12	9
13	8
14	7
15	6
16	5
17	4
18	3
19	2
20	1

== Prize money ==
In 2010, prize money was awarded to all rider scoring points, with €300 going to each race winner, €250 to the runners-up, gradually declining from there, with €50 going to all teams placed 12th to 20th. Additionally, every team qualified for the race plus the two reserve teams receive €500 in travel compensation.

== Calendar ==
The calendar for the 2010 season:

Date	Place	Race winners	GP winner	Source
5 April	(Netherlands) Oldebroek	(Netherlands) Daniël Willemsen / Gertie Eggink	(Netherlands) Daniël Willemsen / Gertie Eggink	Result
5 April	(Netherlands) Oldebroek	(Netherlands) Daniël Willemsen / Gertie Eggink	(Netherlands) Daniël Willemsen / Gertie Eggink	Result
18 April	(United Kingdom) Langrish	(Latvia) Maris Rupeiks / Kaspars Stupelis	(Latvia) Maris Rupeiks / Kaspars Stupelis	Result
18 April	(United Kingdom) Langrish	(Belgium) Joris Hendrickx / Kaspars Liepiņš	(Latvia) Maris Rupeiks / Kaspars Stupelis	Result
2 May	(France) Plomion	(Netherlands) Daniël Willemsen / Gertie Eggink	(Belgium) Joris Hendrickx / Kaspars Liepiņš	Result
2 May	(France) Plomion	(Belgium) Joris Hendrickx / Kaspars Liepiņš	(Belgium) Joris Hendrickx / Kaspars Liepiņš	Result
16 May	(Italy) Cingoli	(Belgium) Jan Hendrickx / Tim Smeuninx	(Belgium) Joris Hendrickx / Kaspars Liepiņš	Result
16 May	(Italy) Cingoli	(Netherlands) Daniël Willemsen / Gertie Eggink	(Belgium) Joris Hendrickx / Kaspars Liepiņš	Result
6 June	(Poland) Wschowa	(Netherlands) Daniël Willemsen / Gertie Eggink	(Belgium) Jan Hendrickx / Tim Smeuninx	Result
6 June	(Poland) Wschowa	(Belgium) Jan Hendrickx / Tim Smeuninx	(Belgium) Jan Hendrickx / Tim Smeuninx	Result
13 June	(Ukraine) Chernivtsi	(Netherlands) Daniël Willemsen / Gertie Eggink	(Belgium) Jan Hendrickx / Tim Smeuninx	Result
13 June	(Ukraine) Chernivtsi	(Belgium) Jan Hendrickx / Tim Smeuninx	(Belgium) Jan Hendrickx / Tim Smeuninx	Result
4 July	(Belgium) Genk	(Netherlands) Daniël Willemsen / Gertie Eggink	(Netherlands) Daniël Willemsen / Gertie Eggink	Result
4 July	(Belgium) Genk	(Belgium) Joris Hendrickx / Kaspars Liepiņš	(Netherlands) Daniël Willemsen / Gertie Eggink	Result
11 July	(Germany) Strassbessenbach	(Netherlands) Daniël Willemsen / Gertie Eggink	(Netherlands) Daniël Willemsen / Gertie Eggink	Result
11 July	(Germany) Strassbessenbach	(Netherlands) Daniël Willemsen / Gertie Eggink	(Netherlands) Daniël Willemsen / Gertie Eggink	Result
18 July	(France) Saint-Mamet	(Netherlands) Daniël Willemsen / Gertie Eggink	(Belgium) Joris Hendrickx / Kaspars Liepiņš	Result
18 July	(France) Saint-Mamet	(Belgium) Joris Hendrickx / Kaspars Liepiņš	(Belgium) Joris Hendrickx / Kaspars Liepiņš	Result
1 August	(Estonia) Kiviõli	(Netherlands) Daniël Willemsen / Gertie Eggink	(Netherlands) Daniël Willemsen / Gertie Eggink	Result
1 August	(Estonia) Kiviõli	(Netherlands) Daniël Willemsen / Gertie Eggink	(Netherlands) Daniël Willemsen / Gertie Eggink	Result
8 August	(Latvia) Ķegums	(Netherlands) Daniël Willemsen / Gertie Eggink	(Belgium) Joris Hendrickx / Kaspars Liepiņš	Result
8 August	(Latvia) Ķegums	(Belgium) Joris Hendrickx / Kaspars Liepiņš	(Belgium) Joris Hendrickx / Kaspars Liepiņš	Result
15 August	(Russia) Penza	(Belgium) Joris Hendrickx / Kaspars Liepiņš	(Belgium) Joris Hendrickx / Kaspars Liepiņš	Result
15 August	(Russia) Penza	(Netherlands) Daniël Willemsen / Gertie Eggink	(Belgium) Joris Hendrickx / Kaspars Liepiņš	Result
5 September	(Denmark) Slagelse	(Netherlands) Daniël Willemsen / Dagwin Sabbe	(Netherlands) Daniël Willemsen / Dagwin Sabbe	Result
5 September	(Denmark) Slagelse	(Netherlands) Etienne Bax / Ben van den Bogaart	(Netherlands) Daniël Willemsen / Dagwin Sabbe	Result
12 September	(Germany) Rudersberg	(Germany) Marko Happich / Martin Betschart	(Netherlands) Etienne Bax / Ben van den Bogaart	Result
12 September	(Germany) Rudersberg	(Netherlands) Etienne Bax / Ben van den Bogaart	(Netherlands) Etienne Bax / Ben van den Bogaart	Result
26 September	(Slovakia) Sverepec	Netherlands		

- The Sidecarcross des Nations is a non-championship event but part of the calendar and is denoted by a light blue background in the table above.
- Flags for passengers not shown.

== Classification ==
=== Riders ===
The top ten teams in the final overall standings were:

Position	Driver / Passenger	Equipment	Bike No	Points
1	(Netherlands) Daniël Willemsen / Gertie Eggink	Zabel-WSP	111	556
2	(Belgium) Joris Hendrickx / (Latvia) Kaspars Liepins	KTM-VMC	1	547
3	(Belgium) Jan Hendrickx / Tim Smeuninx	KTM-VMC	2	464
4	(Netherlands) Etienne Bax / (Belgium) Ben van den Bogaart	Zabel-EML	8	456
5	(Latvia) Maris Rupeiks / Kaspars Stupelis	KTM-WSP	7	423
6	(Belgium) Ben Adriaenssen / (Netherlands) Kenny van Gaalen	KTM-VMC	18	322
7	(Czech Republic) Tomas Cermak / Ondrej Cermak	JAWA-MEFO	10	286
8	(Latvia) Janis Daiders / Lauris Daiders	KTM-VMC	3	283
9	(France) Baptiste Bigand / Julien Bigand	Zabel-VMC	33	243
10	(Netherlands) Jan Visscher / Jeroen Visscher	Zabel-VMC	15	232

- Equipment listed is motor and frame.

=== Manufacturers ===
Parallel to the riders championship, a manufacturers competition is also held. In every race, only the best-placed rider of every make is awarded points in this competition.

The final overall standings in the manufacturers competition were:

Position	Manufacturer	Points
1	WSP	626
2	VMC	617
3	MEFO	400
4	Husaberg	218
5	KTM	184
6	AYR	83
7	BETA	13

== 2010 season races ==
=== Oldebroek - Netherlands ===
The top ten of the first Grand Prix of the 2010 season, held on Easter Monday, 5 April 2010, at Oldebroek in the Netherlands:

Top Ten Finishers
Pos.	Race 1			Race 2		
	#	Team	Make	#	Team	Make
1	111	(Netherlands) Daniël Willemsen / Gertie Eggink	Zabel-WSP	111	(Netherlands) Daniël Willemsen / Gertie Eggink	Zabel-WSP
2	8	(Netherlands) Etienne Bax / Ben van den Bogaart	Zabel-EML	7	(Latvia) Maris Rupeiks / Kaspars Stupelis	KTM-WSP
3	18	(Belgium) Ben Adriaenssen / Kenny van Gaalen	KTM-VMC	18	(Belgium) Ben Adriaenssen / Kenny van Gaalen	KTM-VMC
4	7	(Latvia) Maris Rupeiks / Kaspars Stupelis	KTM-WSP	2	(Belgium) Jan Hendrickx / Tim Smeuninx	KTM-VMC
5	24	(Netherlands) Marcel Willemsen / Bruno Kaelin	Zabel-WSP	8	(Netherlands) Etienne Bax / Ben van den Boogaert	Zabel-EML
6	1	(Belgium) Joris Hendrickx / Kaspars Liepins	KTM-VMC	9	(United Kingdom) Stuart Brown / Luke Peters	Husaberg-MEFO
7	3	(Latvia) Janis Daiders / Lauris Daiders	KTM-VMC	4	(Germany) Marko Happich / Martin Betschart	Zabel-MEFO
8	2	(Belgium) Jan Hendrickx / Tim Smeuninx	KTM-VMC	3	(Latvia) Janis Daiders / Lauris Daiders	KTM-VMC
9	33	(France) Baptiste Bigand / Julien Bigand	Zabel-VMC	1	(Belgium) Joris Hendrickx / Kaspars Liepins	KTM-VMC
10	9	(United Kingdom) Stuart Brown / Luke Peters	Husaberg-MEFO	33	(France) Baptiste Bigand / Julien Bigand	Zabel-VMC

=== Langrish - Great Britain ===
The top ten of the British Grand Prix, held on 18 April at Langrish:

Top Ten Finishers
Pos.	Race 1			Race 2		
	#	Team	Make	#	Team	Make
1	7	(Latvia) Maris Rupeiks / Kaspars Stupelis	KTM-WSP	1	(Belgium) Joris Hendrickx / Kaspars Liepins	KTM-VMC
2	2	(Belgium) Jan Hendrickx / Tim Smeuninx	KTM-VMC	7	(Latvia) Maris Rupeiks / Kaspars Stupelis	KTM-WSP
3	111	(Netherlands) Daniël Willemsen / Gertie Eggink	Zabel-WSP	111	(Netherlands) Daniël Willemsen / Gertie Eggink	Zabel-WSP
4	1	(Belgium) Joris Hendrickx / Kaspars Liepins	KTM-VMC	2	(Belgium) Jan Hendrickx / Tim Smeuninx	KTM-VMC
5	3	(Latvia) Janis Daiders / Lauris Daiders	KTM-VMC	11	(Belgium) Peter Steegmans / Sven Verbrugge	KTM-WSP
6	33	(France) Baptiste Bigand / Julien Bigand	Zabel-VMC	3	(Latvia) Janis Daiders / Lauris Daiders	KTM-VMC
7	10	(Czech Republic) Tomas Cermak / Ondrej Cermak	JAWA-MEFO	33	(France) Baptiste Bigand / Julien Bigand	Zabel-VMC
8	6	(Czech Republic) Vaclav Rozehnal / Marek Rozehnal	Zabel-VMC	9	(United Kingdom) Stuart Brown / Luke Peters	Husaberg-MEFO
9	18	(Belgium) Ben Adriaenssen / Kenny van Gaalen	KTM-VMC	18	(Belgium) Ben Adriaenssen / Kenny van Gaalen	KTM-VMC
10	9	(United Kingdom) Stuart Brown / Luke Peters	Husaberg-MEFO	14	(Germany) Thomas Morch / Robbie Bax	Zabel-WHT

=== Plomion - France ===
The top ten of the first of two French Grand Prix in 2010, held on 2 May at Plomion:

Top Ten Finishers
Pos.	Race 1			Race 2		
	#	Team	Make	#	Team	Make
1	111	(Netherlands) Daniël Willemsen / Gertie Eggink	Zabel-WSP	1	(Belgium) Joris Hendrickx / Kaspars Liepins	KTM-VMC
2	1	(Belgium) Joris Hendrickx / Kaspars Liepins	KTM-VMC	30	(Russia) Ewgeny Scherbinin / Haralds Kurpnieks	KTM-WSP
3	30	(Russia) Ewgeny Scherbinin / Haralds Kurpnieks	KTM-WSP	2	(Belgium) Jan Hendrickx / Tim Smeuninx	KTM-VMC
4	3	(Latvia) Janis Daiders / Lauris Daiders	KTM-VMC	33	(France) Baptiste Bigand / Julien Bigand	Zabel-VMC
5	6	(Czech Republic) Vaclav Rozehnal / Marek Rozehnal	Zabel-VMC	15	(Netherlands) Jan Visscher / Jeroen Visscher	Zabel-VMC
6	7	(Latvia) Maris Rupeiks / Kaspars Stupelis	KTM-WSP	11	(Belgium) Peter Steegmans / Sven Verbrugge	KTM-WSP
7	18	(Belgium) Ben Adriaenssen / Kenny van Gaalen	KTM-VMC	7	(Latvia) Maris Rupeiks / Kaspars Stupelis	KTM-WSP
8	8	(Netherlands) Etienne Bax / Ben van den Boogaert	Zabel-EML	9	(United Kingdom) Stuart Brown / Luke Peters	Husaberg-MEFO
9	15	(Netherlands) Jan Visscher / Jeroen Visscher	Zabel-VMC	3	(Latvia) Janis Daiders / Lauris Daiders	KTM-VMC
10	10	(Czech Republic) Tomas Cermak / Ondrej Cermak	JAWA-MEFO	24	(Netherlands) Marcel Willemsen / Bruno Kaelin	Zabel-WSP

=== Cingoli - Italy ===
The top ten of the Italian Grand Prix in 2010, held on 16 May at Cingoli:

Top Ten Finishers
Pos.	Race 1			Race 2		
	#	Team	Make	#	Team	Make
1	2	(Belgium) Jan Hendrickx / Tim Smeuninx	KTM-VMC	111	(Netherlands) Daniël Willemsen / Gertie Eggink	Zabel-WSP
2	1	(Belgium) Joris Hendrickx / Kaspars Liepins	KTM-VMC	1	(Belgium) Joris Hendrickx / Kaspars Liepins	KTM-VMC
3	4	(Germany) Marko Happich / Martin Betschart	Zabel-MEFO	7	(Latvia) Maris Rupeiks / Kaspars Stupelis	KTM-WSP
4	111	(Netherlands) Daniël Willemsen / Gertie Eggink	Zabel-WSP	2	(Belgium) Jan Hendrickx / Tim Smeuninx	KTM-VMC
5	7	(Latvia) Maris Rupeiks / Kaspars Stupelis	KTM-WSP	8	(Netherlands) Etienne Bax / Ben van den Boogaert	Zabel-EML
6	17	(United Kingdom) Daniel Millard / Joe Millard	Husaberg-WHT	4	(Germany) Marko Happich / Martin Betschart	Zabel-MEFO
7	9	(United Kingdom) Stuart Brown / Luke Peters	Husaberg-MEFO	17	(United Kingdom) Daniel Millard / Joe Millard	Husaberg-WHT
8	8	(Netherlands) Etienne Bax / Ben van den Boogaert	Zabel-EML	3	(Latvia) Janis Daiders / Lauris Daiders	KTM-VMC
9	3	(Latvia) Janis Daiders / Lauris Daiders	KTM-VMC	11	(Belgium) Peter Steegmans / Sven Verbrugge	KTM-WSP
10	10	(Czech Republic) Tomas Cermak / Ondrej Cermak	JAWA-MEFO	10	(Czech Republic) Tomas Cermak / Ondrej Cermak	JAWA-MEFO

=== Wschowa - Poland ===
The top ten of the Polish Grand Prix in 2010, held on 6 June at Wschowa:

Top Ten Finishers
Pos.	Race 1			Race 2		
	#	Team	Make	#	Team	Make
1	111	(Netherlands) Daniël Willemsen / Gertie Eggink	Zabel-WSP	2	(Belgium) Jan Hendrickx / Tim Smeuninx	KTM-VMC
2	1	(Belgium) Joris Hendrickx / Kaspars Liepins	KTM-VMC	3	(Latvia) Janis Daiders / Lauris Daiders	KTM-VMC
3	2	(Belgium) Jan Hendrickx / Tim Smeuninx	KTM-VMC	18	(Belgium) Ben Adriaenssen / Kenny van Gaalen	KTM-VMC
4	8	(Netherlands) Etienne Bax / Ben van den Boogaert	Zabel-EML	7	(Latvia) Maris Rupeiks / Kaspars Stupelis	KTM-WSP
5	18	(Belgium) Ben Adriaenssen / Kenny van Gaalen	KTM-VMC	6	(Czech Republic) Vaclav Rozehnal / Marek Rozehnal	Zabel-VMC
6	6	(Czech Republic) Vaclav Rozehnal / Marek Rozehnal	Zabel-VMC	11	(Belgium) Peter Steegmans / Sven Verbrugge	KTM-WSP
7	7	(Latvia) Maris Rupeiks / Kaspars Stupelis	KTM-WSP	10	(Czech Republic) Tomas Cermak / Ondrej Cermak	JAWA-MEFO
8	15	(Netherlands) Jan Visscher / Jeroen Visscher	Zabel-VMC	8	(Netherlands) Etienne Bax / Ben van den Boogaert	Zabel-EML
9	10	(Czech Republic) Tomas Cermak / Ondrej Cermak	JAWA-MEFO	111	(Netherlands) Daniël Willemsen / Gertie Eggink	Zabel-WSP
10	4	(Germany) Marko Happich / Martin Betschart	Zabel-MEFO	33	(France) Baptiste Bigand / Julien Bigand	Zabel-VMC

=== Chernivtsi - Ukraine ===
The top ten of the Ukrainian Grand Prix in 2010, held on 13 June at Chernivtsi:

Top Ten Finishers
Pos.	Race 1			Race 2		
	#	Team	Make	#	Team	Make
1	111	(Netherlands) Daniël Willemsen / Gertie Eggink	Zabel-WSP	2	(Belgium) Jan Hendrickx / Tim Smeuninx	KTM-VMC
2	1	(Belgium) Joris Hendrickx / Kaspars Liepins	KTM-VMC	7	(Latvia) Maris Rupeiks / Kaspars Stupelis	KTM-WSP
3	33	(France) Baptiste Bigand / Julien Bigand	Zabel-VMC	1	(Belgium) Joris Hendrickx / Kaspars Liepins	KTM-VMC
4	2	(Belgium) Jan Hendrickx / Tim Smeuninx	KTM-VMC	3	(Latvia) Janis Daiders / Lauris Daiders	KTM-VMC
5	6	(Czech Republic) Vaclav Rozehnal / Marek Rozehnal	Zabel-VMC	6	(Czech Republic) Vaclav Rozehnal / Marek Rozehnal	Zabel-VMC
6	11	(Belgium) Peter Steegmans / Sven Verbrugge	KTM-WSP	10	(Czech Republic) Tomas Cermak / Ondrej Cermak	JAWA-MEFO
7	8	(Netherlands) Etienne Bax / Ben van den Boogaert	Zabel-EML	18	(Belgium) Ben Adriaenssen / Kenny van Gaalen	KTM-VMC
8	7	(Latvia) Maris Rupeiks / Kaspars Stupelis	KTM-WSP	14	(Germany) Thomas Morch / Robbie Bax	Zabel-WHT
9	14	(Germany) Thomas Morch / Robbie Bax	Zabel-WHT	33	(France) Baptiste Bigand / Julien Bigand	Zabel-VMC
10	10	(Czech Republic) Tomas Cermak / Ondrej Cermak	JAWA-MEFO	9	(United Kingdom) Stuart Brown / Luke Peters	Husaberg-MEFO

=== Genk - Belgium ===
The top ten of the Belgian Grand Prix in 2010, held on 4 July at Genk:

Top Ten Finishers
Pos.	Race 1			Race 2		
	#	Team	Make	#	Team	Make
1	111	(Netherlands) Daniël Willemsen / Gertie Eggink	Zabel-WSP	1	(Belgium) Joris Hendrickx / Kaspars Liepins	KTM-VMC
2	11	(Belgium) Peter Steegmans / Sven Verbrugge	KTM-WSP	8	(Netherlands) Etienne Bax / Ben van den Boogaert	Zabel-EML
3	33	(France) Baptiste Bigand / Julien Bigand	Zabel-VMC	10	(Czech Republic) Tomas Cermak / Ondrej Cermak	JAWA-MEFO
4	8	(Netherlands) Etienne Bax / Ben van den Boogaert	Zabel-EML	111	(Netherlands) Daniël Willemsen / Gertie Eggink	Zabel-WSP
5	2	(Belgium) Jan Hendrickx / Tim Smeuninx	KTM-VMC	3	(Latvia) Janis Daiders / Lauris Daiders	KTM-VMC
6	1	(Belgium) Joris Hendrickx / Kaspars Liepins	KTM-VMC	6	(Czech Republic) Vaclav Rozehnal / Marek Rozehnal	Zabel-VMC
7	9	(United Kingdom) Stuart Brown / Luke Peters	Husaberg-MEFO	15	(Netherlands) Jan Visscher / Jeroen Visscher	Zabel-VMC
8	15	(Netherlands) Jan Visscher / Jeroen Visscher	Zabel-VMC	20	(Germany) Martin Walter / Thomas Weinmann	Zabel-WHT
9	3	(Latvia) Janis Daiders / Lauris Daiders	KTM-VMC	7	(Latvia) Maris Rupeiks / Kaspars Stupelis	KTM-WSP
10	17	(United Kingdom) Daniel Millard / Joe Millard	Husaberg-WHT	17	(United Kingdom) Daniel Millard / Joe Millard	Husaberg-WHT

=== Strassbessenbach - Germany ===
The top ten of the first of two German Grand Prix in 2010, held on 11 July at Strassbessenbach:

Top Ten Finishers
Pos.	Race 1			Race 2		
	#	Team	Make	#	Team	Make
1	111	(Netherlands) Daniël Willemsen / Gertie Eggink	Zabel-WSP	111	(Netherlands) Daniël Willemsen / Gertie Eggink	Zabel-WSP
2	1	(Belgium) Joris Hendrickx / Kaspars Liepins	KTM-VMC	1	(Belgium) Joris Hendrickx / Kaspars Liepins	KTM-VMC
3	11	(Belgium) Peter Steegmans / Sven Verbrugge	KTM-WSP	8	(Netherlands) Etienne Bax / Ben van den Boogaert	Zabel-EML
4	8	(Netherlands) Etienne Bax / Ben van den Boogaert	Zabel-EML	10	(Czech Republic) Tomas Cermak / Ondrej Cermak	JAWA-MEFO
5	3	(Latvia) Janis Daiders / Lauris Daiders	KTM-VMC	3	(Latvia) Janis Daiders / Lauris Daiders	KTM-VMC
6	6	(Czech Republic) Vaclav Rozehnal / Marek Rozehnal	Zabel-VMC	7	(Latvia) Maris Rupeiks / Kaspars Stupelis	KTM-WSP
7	18	(Belgium) Ben Adriaenssen / Kenny van Gaalen	KTM-VMC	11	(Belgium) Peter Steegmans / Sven Verbrugge	KTM-WSP
8	2	(Belgium) Jan Hendrickx / Tim Smeuninx	KTM-VMC	4	(Germany) Marko Happich / Martin Betschart	Zabel-MEFO
9	33	(France) Baptiste Bigand / Julien Bigand	Zabel-VMC	18	(Belgium) Ben Adriaenssen / Kenny van Gaalen	KTM-VMC
10	10	(Czech Republic) Tomas Cermak / Ondrej Cermak	JAWA-MEFO	17	(United Kingdom) Daniel Millard / Joe Millard	Husaberg-WHT

=== Saint-Mamet - France ===
The top ten of the second of two French Grand Prix in 2010, held on 18 July at Saint-Mamet:

Top Ten Finishers
Pos.	Race 1			Race 2		
	#	Team	Make	#	Team	Make
1	111	(Netherlands) Daniël Willemsen / Gertie Eggink	Zabel-WSP	1	(Belgium) Joris Hendrickx / Kaspars Liepins	KTM-VMC
2	1	(Belgium) Joris Hendrickx / Kaspars Liepins	KTM-VMC	111	(Netherlands) Daniël Willemsen / Gertie Eggink	Zabel-WSP
3	2	(Belgium) Jan Hendrickx / Tim Smeuninx	KTM-VMC	2	(Belgium) Jan Hendrickx / Tim Smeuninx	KTM-VMC
4	3	(Latvia) Janis Daiders / Lauris Daiders	KTM-VMC	7	(Latvia) Maris Rupeiks / Kaspars Stupelis	KTM-WSP
5	11	(Belgium) Peter Steegmans / Sven Verbrugge	KTM-WSP	9	(United Kingdom) Stuart Brown / Luke Peters	Husaberg-MEFO
6	7	(Latvia) Maris Rupeiks / Kaspars Stupelis	KTM-WSP	11	(Belgium) Peter Steegmans / Sven Verbrugge	KTM-WSP
7	33	(France) Baptiste Bigand / Julien Bigand	Zabel-VMC	6	(Czech Republic) Vaclav Rozehnal / Marek Rozehnal	Zabel-VMC
8	6	(Czech Republic) Vaclav Rozehnal / Marek Rozehnal	Zabel-VMC	18	(Belgium) Ben Adriaenssen / Kenny van Gaalen	KTM-VMC
9	10	(Czech Republic) Tomas Cermak / Ondrej Cermak	JAWA-MEFO	4	(Germany) Marko Happich / Martin Betschart	Zabel-MEFO
10	8	(Netherlands) Etienne Bax / Ben van den Boogaert	Zabel-EML	8	(Netherlands) Etienne Bax / Ben van den Boogaert	Zabel-EML

=== Kiviõli - Estonia ===
The top ten of the Estonian Grand Prix in 2010, held on 1 August at Kiviõli:

Top Ten Finishers
Pos.	Race 1			Race 2		
	#	Team	Make	#	Team	Make
1	111	(Netherlands) Daniël Willemsen / Gertie Eggink	Zabel-WSP	111	(Netherlands) Daniël Willemsen / Gertie Eggink	Zabel-WSP
2	1	(Belgium) Joris Hendrickx / Kaspars Liepins	KTM-VMC	1	(Belgium) Joris Hendrickx / Kaspars Liepins	KTM-VMC
3	2	(Belgium) Jan Hendrickx / Tim Smeuninx	KTM-VMC	3	(Latvia) Janis Daiders / Lauris Daiders	KTM-VMC
4	3	(Latvia) Janis Daiders / Lauris Daiders	KTM-VMC	2	(Belgium) Jan Hendrickx / Tim Smeuninx	KTM-VMC
5	8	(Netherlands) Etienne Bax / Ben van den Boogaert	Zabel-EML	11	(Belgium) Peter Steegmans / Sven Verbrugge	KTM-WSP
6	7	(Latvia) Maris Rupeiks / Kaspars Stupelis	KTM-WSP	7	(Latvia) Maris Rupeiks / Kaspars Stupelis	KTM-WSP
7	11	(Belgium) Peter Steegmans / Sven Verbrugge	KTM-WSP	6	(Czech Republic) Vaclav Rozehnal / Marek Rozehnal	Zabel-VMC
8	4	(Germany) Marko Happich / Martin Betschart	Zabel-MEFO	4	(Germany) Marko Happich / Martin Betschart	Zabel-MEFO
9	33	(France) Baptiste Bigand / Julien Bigand	Zabel-VMC	18	(Belgium) Ben Adriaenssen / Kenny van Gaalen	KTM-VMC
10	6	(Czech Republic) Vaclav Rozehnal / Marek Rozehnal	Zabel-VMC	8	(Netherlands) Etienne Bax / Ben van den Boogaert	Zabel-EML

=== Ķegums - Latvia ===
The top ten of the Latvian Grand Prix in 2010, held on 8 August at Ķegums:

Top Ten Finishers
Pos.	Race 1			Race 2		
	#	Team	Make	#	Team	Make
1	111	(Netherlands) Daniël Willemsen / Gertie Eggink	Zabel-WSP	1	(Belgium) Joris Hendrickx / Kaspars Liepins	KTM-VMC
2	1	(Belgium) Joris Hendrickx / Kaspars Liepins	KTM-VMC	8	(Netherlands) Etienne Bax / Ben van den Boogaert	Zabel-EML
3	7	(Latvia) Maris Rupeiks / Kaspars Stupelis	KTM-WSP	2	(Belgium) Jan Hendrickx / Tim Smeuninx	KTM-VMC
4	2	(Belgium) Jan Hendrickx / Tim Smeuninx	KTM-VMC	7	(Latvia) Maris Rupeiks / Kaspars Stupelis	KTM-WSP
5	18	(Belgium) Ben Adriaenssen / Kenny van Gaalen	KTM-VMC	18	(Belgium) Ben Adriaenssen / Kenny van Gaalen	KTM-VMC
6	6	(Czech Republic) Vaclav Rozehnal / Marek Rozehnal	Zabel-VMC	6	(Czech Republic) Vaclav Rozehnal / Marek Rozehnal	Zabel-VMC
7	8	(Netherlands) Etienne Bax / Ben van den Boogaert	Zabel-EML	34	(Latvia) Arnolds Silis / Gints Silis	Zabel-VMC
8	10	(Czech Republic) Tomas Cermak / Ondrej Cermak	JAWA-MEFO	84	(Switzerland) Andy Bürgler / Markus Gloor	KTM-VMC
9	9	(United Kingdom) Stuart Brown / Luke Peters	Husaberg-MEFO	17	(United Kingdom) Daniel Millard / Joe Millard	Husaberg-WHT
10	14	(Germany) Thomas Morch / Robbie Bax	Zabel-WHT	15	(Netherlands) Jan Visscher / Jeroen Visscher	Zabel-VMC

=== Penza - Russia ===
The top ten of the Russian Grand Prix in 2010, held on 15 August at Penza:

Top Ten Finishers
Pos.	Race 1			Race 2		
	#	Team	Make	#	Team	Make
1	1	(Belgium) Joris Hendrickx / Kaspars Liepins	KTM-VMC	111	(Netherlands) Daniël Willemsen / Gertie Eggink	Zabel-WSP
2	8	(Netherlands) Etienne Bax / Ben van den Boogaert	Zabel-EML	1	(Belgium) Joris Hendrickx / Kaspars Liepins	KTM-VMC
3	111	(Netherlands) Daniël Willemsen / Gertie Eggink	Zabel-WSP	8	(Netherlands) Etienne Bax / Ben van den Boogaert	Zabel-EML
4	18	(Belgium) Ben Adriaenssen / Kenny van Gaalen	KTM-VMC	2	(Belgium) Jan Hendrickx / Tim Smeuninx	KTM-VMC
5	10	(Czech Republic) Tomas Cermak / Ondrej Cermak	JAWA-MEFO	10	(Czech Republic) Tomas Cermak / Ondrej Cermak	JAWA-MEFO
6	15	(Netherlands) Jan Visscher / Jeroen Visscher	Zabel-VMC	15	(Netherlands) Jan Visscher / Jeroen Visscher	Zabel-VMC
7	31	(Russia) Roman Koch / Aleksey Bessarabov	KTM	18	(Belgium) Ben Adriaenssen / Kenny van Gaalen	KTM-VMC
8	41	(Russia) Igor Rodionov / Dimitri Rodionov	KTM-AYR	27	(Netherlands) Thijs Derks / Roy Derks	Husaberg-EML
9	3	(Latvia) Janis Daiders / Elvijs Mucenieks	KTM-VMC	31	(Russia) Roman Koch / Aleksey Bessarabov	KTM
10	30	(Russia) Ewgeny Scherbinin / Roman Vasyliaka	KTM-WSP	28	(Estonia) Gert Gordejev / Maarek Miil	KTM-VMC

=== Slagelse - Denmark ===
The top ten of the Danish Grand Prix in 2010, held on 5 September at Slagelse:

Top Ten Finishers
Pos.	Race 1			Race 2		
	#	Team	Make	#	Team	Make
1	111	(Netherlands) Daniël Willemsen / Dagwin Sabbe	Zabel-WSP	8	(Netherlands) Etienne Bax / Ben van den Boogaert	Zabel-EML
2	18	(Belgium) Ben Adriaenssen / Kenny van Gaalen	KTM-VMC	111	(Netherlands) Daniël Willemsen / Dagwin Sabbe	Zabel-WSP
3	2	(Belgium) Jan Hendrickx / Tim Smeuninx	KTM-VMC	2	(Belgium) Jan Hendrickx / Tim Smeuninx	KTM-VMC
4	8	(Netherlands) Etienne Bax / Ben van den Boogaert	Zabel-EML	1	(Belgium) Joris Hendrickx / Kaspars Liepins	KTM-VMC
5	9	(United Kingdom) Stuart Brown / Luke Peters	Husaberg-MEFO	7	(Latvia) Maris Rupeiks / Kaspars Stupelis	KTM-WSP
6	19	(Sweden) Hendrik Söderqvist / Tobias Sylwan	Husaberg-MEFO	10	(Czech Republic) Tomas Cermak / Ondrej Cermak	JAWA-MEFO
7	10	(Czech Republic) Tomas Cermak / Ondrej Cermak	JAWA-MEFO	21	(Sweden) Robert Gustavsson / Henrik Apelgren	Husaberg-VMC
8	24	(Netherlands) Marcel Willemsen / Guennady Auvray	Zabel-WSP	15	(Netherlands) Jan Visscher / Jeroen Visscher	Zabel-VMC
9	33	(France) Baptiste Bigand / Julien Bigand	Zabel-VMC	77	(Belgium) Kristof Santermans / Elvis Mucenieks	Zabel-VMC
10	15	(Netherlands) Jan Visscher / Jeroen Visscher	Zabel-VMC	49	(Netherlands) Marcel Grondman / Rick Sellis	Zabel-VMC

=== Rudersberg - Germany ===
The top ten of the second German Grand Prix in 2010, held on 12 September at Rudersberg:

Top Ten Finishers
Pos.	Race 1			Race 2		
	#	Team	Make	#	Team	Make
1	4	(Germany) Marko Happich / Martin Betschart	Zabel-MEFO	8	(Netherlands) Etienne Bax / Ben van den Boogaert	Zabel-EML
2	8	(Netherlands) Etienne Bax / Ben van den Boogaert	Zabel-EML	7	(Latvia) Maris Rupeiks / Kaspars Stupelis	KTM-WSP
3	19	(Sweden) Hendrik Söderqvist / Tobias Sylwan	Husaberg-MEFO	1	(Belgium) Joris Hendrickx / Kaspars Liepins	KTM-VMC
4	7	(Latvia) Maris Rupeiks / Kaspars Stupelis	KTM-WSP	19	(Sweden) Hendrik Söderqvist / Tobias Sylwan	Husaberg-MEFO
5	111	(Netherlands) Daniël Willemsen / Dagwin Sabbe	Zabel-WSP	2	(Belgium) Jan Hendrickx / Tim Smeuninx	KTM-VMC
6	1	(Belgium) Joris Hendrickx / Kaspars Liepins	KTM-VMC	17	(United Kingdom) Daniel Millard / Joe Millard	Husaberg-WHT
7	2	(Belgium) Jan Hendrickx / Tim Smeuninx	KTM-VMC	4	(Germany) Marko Happich / Martin Betschart	Zabel-MEFO
8	11	(Belgium) Peter Steegmans / Sven Verbrugge	KTM-WSP	18	(Belgium) Ben Adriaenssen / Kenny van Gaalen	KTM-VMC
9	17	(United Kingdom) Daniel Millard / Joe Millard	Husaberg-WHT	111	(Netherlands) Daniël Willemsen / Dagwin Sabbe	Zabel-WSP
10	21	(Sweden) Robert Gustavsson / Henrik Apelgren	Husaberg-VMC	75	(United Kingdom) Scott Wilkinson / Josh Chamberlain	Zabel-VMC

=== Notes ===
Grand Prix winner

- Flags for passengers not shown.

== Race by race statistics ==
The final classification of all 72 teams in the points during the 2010 season and their points scored in each individual race:

P	Team	No	Equipment	Points	NED		GB		FRA		ITA		POL		UKR		BEL		GER		FRA		EST		LAT		RUS		DEN		GER	
1	Daniel Willemsen-Gertie Eggink	111	WSP/Zabel	556	25	25	20	20	25	1	18	25	25	12	25	0	25	18	25	25	25	22	25	25	25	0	20	25	25	22	16	12
2	Joris Hendrickx-Kaspars Liepiņš	1	VMC/KTM	547	15	12	18	25	22	25	22	22	22	0	22	20	15	25	22	22	22	25	22	22	22	25	25	22	0	18	15	20
3	Jan Hendrickx-Tim Smeuninx	2	VMC/KTM	464	13	18	22	18	0	20	25	18	20	25	18	25	16	9	13	-	20	20	20	18	18	20	-	18	20	20	14	16
4	Etienne Bax-Ben van den Bogaart	8	VMC/Zabel	456	22	16	10	9	13	10	13	16	18	13	14	7	18	22	18	20	11	11	16	11	14	22	22	20	18	25	22	25
5	Māris Rupeiks-Kaspars Stupelis	7	WSP/KTM	423	18	22	25	22	15	14	16	20	14	18	13	22	0	12	10	15	15	18	15	15	20	18	3	7	0	16	18	22
6	Ben Adriaenssen-Kenny van Gaalen	18	VMC/KTM	322	20	20	12	12	14	0	9	7	16	20	9	14	0	-	14	12	7	13	10	12	16	16	18	14	22	0	2	13
7	Tomas Cermak-Ondrej Cermak	10	MEFO/JAWA	286	5	1	14	0	11	7	11	11	12	14	11	15	10	20	11	18	12	0	0	9	13	1	16	16	14	15	9	10
8	Jānis Daiders-Lauris Daiders	3	VMC/KTM	283	14	13	16	15	18	12	12	13	0	22	0	18	12	16	16	16	18	2	18	20	-	-	12	-	-	-	-	-
9	Baptiste Bigand-Julien Bigand	33	VMC/Zabel	243	12	11	15	14	10	18	10	6	10	11	20	12	20	3	12	-	14	3	12	0	10	0	-	-	12	0	8	0
10	Jan Visscher-Jeroen Visscher	15	VMC/Zabel	232	8	0	3	7	12	16	8	1	13	9	0	9	13	14	5	8	1	6	3	10	8	11	15	15	11	13	10	3
11	Vaclav Rozehnal-Marek Rozehnal	6	VMC/Zabel	228	0	0	13	2	16	9	3	3	15	16	16	16	7	15	15	-	13	14	11	14	15	15	-	-	-	-	-	-
12	Peter Steegmans-Sven Verbrugge	11	WSP/KTM	225	0	0	0	16	2	15	6	12	8	15	15	6	22	0	20	14	16	15	14	16	-	-	-	-	-	-	13	0
13	Stuart Brown-Luke Peters	9	MEFO/Husaberg	223	11	15	11	13	5	13	14	8	2	0	10	11	14	10	9	4	10	16	6	7	12	0	-	-	16	6	0	-
14	Daniel Millard-Joe Millard	17	WHT/Husaberg	206	9	9	8	10	0	-	15	14	7	10	8	10	11	11	4	11	5	10	5	0	0	12	-	-	10	0	12	15
15	Marco Happich-Martin Betschart	4	MEFO/Zabel	177	7	14	0	-	4	0	20	15	11	-	-	-	0	0	8	13	8	12	13	13	0	-	-	-	-	-	25	14
16	Thomas Morch-Robbie Bax	14	WHT/Zabel	153	-	-	9	11	3	5	4	0	6	3	12	13	4	6	6	10	-	-	8	0	11	10	-	-	7	9	7	9
17	Thijs Derks-Roy Derks	27	EML/Husaberg	94	0	2	0	0	7	8	0	5	4	0	3	8	6	2	3	7	0	0	7	0	5	0	7	13	0	7	0	-
18	Andy Burgler-Markus Gloor	84	VMC/KTM	83	-	-	-	-	-	-	2	4	3	8	-	-	8	0	2	6	3	9	0	4	6	13	-	-	8	0	0	7
19	Arnolds Sīlis-Gints Sīlis	34	VMC/Zabel	80	-	-	-	-	-	-	-	-	5	7	7	2	-	-	-	-	-	-	9	8	9	14	10	9	-	-	-	-
20	Evgeny Scherbinin-Roman Vasyliaka	30	WSP/KTM	70	3	0	0	-	20	22	0	10	-	-	-	-	-	-	-	-	-	-	-	-	-	-	11	4	-	-	-	-
21	Margo Sonn-Elvijs Mucenieks	23	AYR/KTM	69	-	-	5	8	-	-	0	0	0	6	6	5	1	1	-	-	0	1	4	5	0	8	9	10	-	-	-	-
22	Robert Gustavsson-Henrik Apelgren	21	VMC/Husaberg	64	0	4	6	0	0	0	-	-	1	0	-	-	-	0	0	1	6	8	-	-	-	-	-	-	9	14	11	4
23	Henrik Soderqvist-Tobias Sylwan	19	MEFO/Husaberg	53	-	-	-	-	-	-	-	-	-	-	-	-	-	-	-	-	-	-	-	-	-	-	-	-	15	0	20	18
24	Frank Mulders-Joey van de Venne	48	VMC/MTR	48	1	7	2	6	0	0	-	-	-	-	-	-	9	8	-	-	-	-	-	-	-	-	-	-	4	10	1	0
25	Marcel Willemsen-Bruno Kaelin	24	WSP/Zabel	46	16	0	-	-	6	11	-	-	-	-	-	-	-	-	-	-	-	-	-	-	-	-	-	-	13	0	-	-
26	Igor Rodionov-Dmitri Rodionov	41	AYR/KTM	42	0	5	-	-	0	0	5	0	-	-	-	-	-	-	7	-	-	-	-	-	7	3	13	2	0	0	-	-
27	Richard Jenkins-Pete Girling	52	VMC/Zabel	40	2	6	-	0	9	4	7	2	0	5	-	-	0	-	-	-	-	-	-	-	-	-	-	-	1	4	-	-
28	Marcel Grondman-Rick Sellis	49	VMC/Zabel	39	10	8	0	0	0	0	-	-	-	-	-	-	3	7	-	-	-	-	-	-	-	-	-	-	0	11	-	-
29	Benjamin Daniel-Guennady Auvray	26	WSP/Husaberg	39	-	-	-	-	-	-	-	-	-	-	-	-	-	5	0	9	4	7	-	-	-	-	-	-	-	-	6	8
30	Carlo van Duijnhoven-Tom van Duijnhoven	38	VMC/Zabel	28	4	0	1	-	-	-	0	9	9	0	-	-	0	-	-	-	-	-	-	-	-	-	-	-	5	0	-	-
31	Roman Koch-Aleksey Bessarabov	31	KTM	26	-	-	-	-	-	-	-	-	-	-	-	-	-	-	-	-	-	-	-	-	-	-	14	12	-	-	-	-
32	Jean-Marie Ains-Edouard Chereau	50	Mefo/KTM	26	-	-	0	3	8	6	1	0	0	0	5	3	0	0	-	-	0	0	-	-	-	-	-	-	-	-	-	-
33	Kristof Santermans-Elvis Mucenieks	77	VMC/Zabel	22	-	-	-	-	-	-	-	-	-	-	-	-	-	-	-	-	-	-	-	-	-	-	-	-	0	12	4	6
34	Dean Hyde-Henrik Soderqvist	72	VMC/KTM	19	-	-	-	-	-	-	-	0	-	-	-	-	-	-	-	-	-	-	-	-	-	-	-	-	6	8	0	5
35	Scott Wilkinson-David Keane	75	VMC/Zabel	18	-	-	7	0	-	-	-	-	-	-	-	-	-	-	-	-	-	-	-	-	-	-	-	-	-	-	0	11
36	Gert Gordejev-Maarek Miil	28	VMC/KTM	18	-	-	-	-	-	-	-	-	-	-	-	-	-	-	-	2	-	-	0	-	0	-	5	11	-	-	-	-
37	Kert Varik-Erkki Koiv	60	AYR/KTM	18	0	-	-	-	-	-	-	-	-	-	-	-	-	-	-	-	-	-	0	6	3	9	-	-	-	-	-	-
38	Valentin Giraud-Nicolas Musset	151	VMC/Beta	18	-	-	-	-	-	-	-	-	-	-	-	-	5	0	-	-	9	4	-	-	-	-	-	-	-	-	-	-
39	Maikel Kuster-Wilfried Keuben	73	VMC/Zabel	16	6	10	-	-	-	-	-	-	-	-	-	-	-	-	-	-	-	-	-	-	-	-	-	-	-	-	-	-
40	Sergei Ivanov-Atho Jalas	45	AYR/KTM	14	-	-	-	-	-	-	-	-	-	-	0	0	-	-	-	-	-	-	-	-	-	-	8	6	-	-	-	-
41	Geert Devoldre-Jacques Pillier	99	EML/Husaberg	14	0	0	-	4	-	-	-	-	0	0	0	4	-	-	-	-	0	0	0	0	1	5	-	-	-	-	-	-
42	Martin Walter-Thomas Weinmann	20	WHT/Zabel	13	-	-	-	-	-	-	-	-	-	-	-	-	0	13	-	-	-	-	-	-	-	-	-	-	-	-	-	-
43	Willi Liebl-Milan Gybas	59	MEFO/Husaberg	11	-	-	-	-	-	-	-	-	-	-	0	0	-	-	-	-	0	0	-	-	-	-	6	5	-	-	-	-
44	John Watson-Dagwin Sabbe	71	VMC/Zabel	10	0	0	0	-	-	-	-	-	0	0	-	-	2	0	1	-	2	5	-	-	-	-	-	-	-	-	-	-
45	Argo Poldsaar-Indrek Aljes	43	AYR/KTM	9	-	-	-	-	-	-	-	-	-	-	-	-	-	-	-	-	-	-	0	2	0	7	-	-	-	-	-	-
46	Tobias Grund-Raphael Markert	78	MEFO/Husqvarna	9	-	-	-	-	-	-	-	-	-	4	-	-	-	-	0	5	-	-	-	-	-	-	-	-	-	-	-	-
47	Marat Schafigulin-Alexander Bukin	105		8	-	-	-	-	-	-	-	-	-	-	-	-	-	-	-	-	-	-	-	-	-	-	-	8	-	-	-	-
48	Tommy Sorensen-Andreas Linden	57	AYR/Husaberg	8	-	-	-	-	-	-	-	-	-	-	-	-	-	-	-	-	-	-	-	-	-	-	-	-	3	5	-	-
49	Steven France-Lee Machin	69	VMC/Husaberg	8	0	3	4	1	-	-	-	-	-	-	-	-	0	0	-	-	-	-	-	-	-	-	-	-	-	-	-	-
50	Liutauras Variakojis-Arvydas Davidonis	46	AYR/KTM	8	-	-	-	-	-	-	-	-	0	2	4	1	-	-	-	-	-	-	0	1	-	-	-	-	-	-	-	-
51	Zigmas Žiukas-Jonas Davidonis	56	AYR/KTM	7	-	-	-	-	-	-	-	-	0	0	0	0	-	-	-	-	-	-	-	-	-	-	4	3	-	-	-	-
52	Ular Karing-Juhan Paabstel	95	AYR/KTM	7	-	-	-	-	-	-	-	-	-	-	-	-	-	-	-	-	-	-	2	3	2	0	-	-	-	-	-	-
53	Andreas Rutter-Bruno Kaelin	44	VMC/Zabel	6	-	-	-	-	-	-	0	0	-	-	-	-	-	-	-	-	-	-	-	-	0	6	-	-	-	-	-	-
54	Nick Jarvis-Daniel Chamberlain	58	VMC/KTM	5	-	-	0	0	-	-	-	-	-	-	-	-	-	-	-	-	-	-	-	-	-	-	-	-	-	-	5	0
55	Boudewijn Gommeren-Matthieu Cailleau	42	Bastech/KTM	5	-	-	0	5	-	0	-	-	-	-	-	-	-	-	-	-	0	0	-	-	-	-	-	-	-	-	0	0
56	Kevin Bitsche-Mathias Walser	25	EML/Husaberg	5	-	-	-	-	0	0	-	-	-	-	-	-	-	-	0	-	-	-	-	-	-	-	-	-	-	-	3	2
57	Sonnie Folkesson-Tim Gustavsson	172	MEFO/KTM	5	-	-	-	-	-	-	-	-	-	-	-	-	-	-	-	-	-	-	-	-	-	-	-	-	2	3	0	0
58	Mantas Kišūnas-Rytis Kišūnas	150	AYR/Zabel	4	-	-	-	-	-	-	-	-	-	-	-	-	-	-	-	-	-	-	-	-	0	4	-	-	-	-	-	-
59	Jani Aaronen-Arto Mantila	104	AYR/KTM	4	-	-	-	-	-	-	-	-	-	-	-	-	-	-	-	-	-	-	-	0	4	0	-	-	-	-	-	-
60	Patrick Greup-Marc van Deutekom	116	VMC/Zabel	4	-	-	-	-	-	-	-	-	-	-	-	-	0	4	-	-	-	-	-	-	-	-	-	-	-	-	-	-
61	Dietmar Schmid-Bruno Kaelin	101	WSP/Zabel	3	-	-	-	-	-	-	-	-	-	-	-	-	-	-	0	3	-	-	-	-	-	-	-	-	-	-	-	-
62	Dorian Boileau-Paul Fessard	53	VMC/Husaberg	3	-	0	-	-	0	3	-	-	-	-	-	-	0	-	-	-	-	-	-	-	-	-	-	-	-	-	-	-
63	Marcel Faustmann-Ralf Bernauerr	68	WHT/Zabel	3	-	-	-	-	1	2	0	0	0	0	-	-	-	-	-	-	-	-	-	-	-	-	-	-	-	-	0	0
64	Magnus Birgersson-Johanna Strandberg	121	MEFO/Husaberg	2	-	-	-	-	-	-	-	-	-	-	-	-	-	-	-	-	-	-	-	-	-	-	-	-	0	2	-	-
65	Ilia Smagin-Sergey Leys	97b	KTM	2	-	-	-	-	-	-	-	-	-	-	-	-	-	-	-	-	-	-	-	-	-	-	2	-	-	-	-	-
66	Davy Maris-Ilvars Ameļkins	191	VMC/Zabel	2	-	-	-	-	-	-	-	-	-	-	-	-	-	-	-	-	-	-	-	-	0	2	-	-	-	-	-	-
67	Vadim Briuhov-Viorel Andronic	87	VMC/Zabel	2	-	-	-	-	-	-	-	-	-	-	2	0	-	-	-	-	-	-	-	-	-	-	-	-	-	-	-	-
68	Benny Cle-Louis Eggers	131	VMC/Zabel	2	-	-	-	-	-	-	-	-	0	1	-	-	-	-	-	-	-	-	-	-	-	-	-	-	0	1	-	-
69	Roland Suter-Sandro Micheletto	86	VMC/Zabel	1	-	-	-	-	-	-	-	-	-	-	-	-	-	-	-	-	-	-	-	-	-	-	-	-	-	-	0	1
70	Petro Gorbatenko-Volodumyr Slobodianuk	64	VMC/Zabel	1	-	-	-	-	-	-	-	-	-	-	0	-	-	-	-	-	-	-	-	-	-	-	1	-	-	-	-	-
71	Topi Tala-Teemu Tala	102	WSP/Zabel	1	-	-	-	-	-	-	-	-	-	-	-	-	-	-	-	-	-	-	1	-	-	-	-	-	-	-	-	-
72	Artur Glushenko-Igor Benediuk	90	Zabel	1	-	-	-	-	-	-	-	-	-	-	1	0	-	-	-	-	-	-	-	-	-	-	-	-	-	-	-	-

Race winner
