= Reto Grütter =

Swiss motorcycle racer

- Nationality: Switzerland
- Born: July 17, 1984 (age 42)
- Bike number: 1
Motorcycle racing career statistics
Sidecarcross World Championship
Active years	2003 - 2008
Championships	(2) 2007, 2008
2008 championship position	1st
Starts / Wins / Podiums / Poles / F. laps / Points; 102 / 34 / 35 / / / 1055

Reto Elias Grütter (17 July 1984) is a Swiss sidecarcross passenger and the 2007 and 2008 Sidecarcross World Champion.

Reto Grütter's name can sometimes be found to be, wrongfully, spelled Reto Grutter.

== Sidecarcross world championship results ==
Grütter entered the sidecarcross world championship in 2003 as a nineteen-year-old in the French GP in Pernes Les Fontains, 27 April 2003, becoming the passenger for his countryman Ueli Müller. They raced together in the world championship for four seasons from 2003 to 2006, a 15th place overall in 2005 being their best result but never finishing better than eighth in a race. After the 2006 season, Grütter replaced the Belgian Sven Verbrugge as passenger for Daniël Willemsen who had won his fifth world championship this season. The new combination Willemsen / Grütter dominated the 2007 season in clear fashion, winning 15 out of 16 races and retaining Team Willemsens world championship. Grütter won his first GP on 9 April 2007 in the season opener in Oldebroek, Netherlands. On top of the world championship, the combination also took out the Dutch title. In the 2008 season, Grütter continued to race with Willemsen but an injury prevented him from taking part in the first race of the season and Willemsen replaced him with Bruno Kaelin for the first round. In the 14th race of the season, the team was disqualified after winning the race due to Grütter losing a glove, after a protest by Kristers Sergis. The team took out the 2008 world championship with a 97-point margin to second-placed Kristers Sergis.

At the end of the 2008 season, Willemsen and Grütter split and the later was without a ride for the 2009 world championship season. He raced with Andy Bürgler in the 2009 Swiss championship, winning the national title comfortably.

=== Season by season ===
Season	Driver	Equipment	Position	Points	Races	Wins	Second	Third
2003	(Switzerland) Ueli Müller	Kawasaki-JHR	44	10	10	—	—	—
2004	(Switzerland) Ueli Müller	Kawasaki-JHR	29	49	16	—	—	—
2005	(Switzerland) Ueli Müller	Kawasaki-VMC	15	126	22	—	—	—
2006	(Switzerland) Ueli Müller	Zabel-VMC	16	100	16	—	—	—
2007	(Netherlands) Daniël Willemsen	Zabel-VMC	1	375	16	15	—	—
2008	(Netherlands) Daniël Willemsen	Zabel-VMC	1	495	22	19	—	1
	Overall 2003 - 2008			1055	102	34	—	1

Source:"The John Davey Pages - Reto Grütter". John Davey.

- Passengers in italics.

== Honours ==
=== World Championship ===
- Champions: (2) 2007, 2008

=== Belgium ===
- Champions: (1) 2007

=== Netherlands ===
- Champions: (2) 2007, 2008

=== Switzerland ===
- Champions: (2) 2002, 2009

Sporting positions
Preceded by Sven Verbrugge	Sidecarcross World Champion (passenger); 2007 - 2008	Succeeded by Kaspars Liepins
Preceded by Sven Verbrugge	Dutch national sidecarcross champion (passenger); 2007 - 2008	Succeeded by Christian Verhagen
Preceded by Sven Verbrugge	Belgian national sidecarcross champion (passenger); 2007	Succeeded by Kaspars Liepins
Preceded by Josua Luscher	Swiss national sidecarcross champion (passenger); 2002	Succeeded by Meinrad Schelbert
Preceded by Daniel Heinzer	Swiss national sidecarcross champion (passenger); 2009–present	Incumbent
