= Joris Hendrickx =

Belgian sidecarcross racer

- Nationality: Belgium
- Born: 2 February 1983 (age 43); Turnhout, Belgium
- Bike number: 222
- Website: Official website
Motorcycle racing career statistics
Sidecarcross World Championship
Active years	2003–2012
Manufacturers	MTH-BSU (2004-2005); KTM-AYR (2006-2008); KTM-VMC (2009-2012)
Championships	(1) 2009
2012 championship position	4th
Starts / Wins / Podiums / Poles / F. laps / Points; 198 / 11 / 66 / / / 2,884

Joris Hendrickx (born 2 February 1983) is a Belgian sidecarcross rider and the 2009 World Champion, together with his passenger, the Latvian Kaspars Liepiņš.

Hendrickx is also a three-time Belgian national sidecarcross champion (2008–2010) and the 2013 French and 2015 German champion.

== Sidecarcross results ==
Hendrickx entered the sidecarcross world championship for the first time in the 2003 German Grand Prix, with passenger Roger van de Lagemaat. He finished 11th, and was 42nd in the season.

The following season, Hendrickx took part in considerably more races and, with van de Lagemaat still as his partner, he came eleventh overall with a fifth place in the second race of the Bulgarian GP as his best result. He also finished third in the Belgian national championship that year.

In the 2005 season, Hendrickx used two passengers, van de Lagemaat and Eli Piccart, achieving an eighth place in the world championship, with a fourth-place finish at race on at the Croatian GP his best season result, and another third in the Belgian nationals.

The 2006 season saw Hendrickx race exclusively with Eli Piccart in the world championship, where he finished seventh and earned his first-ever podium finish with a third place in the first race in the French GP. In the national championship of Belgium, he finished third once more.

The following year, again with Eli Piccart as his passenger, Hendrickx stagnated, for the first time not improving his overall finish in the world championship but again earning one podium finish and his fourth third-place finish in the Belgian championship.

In the 2008 season, now with new passenger Kaspars Liepins, the team finished fourth in the world championship, earning four podium finishes. The pair also won the Belgian championship for the first time.

The 2009 season was initially dominated by Daniël Willemsen, who had won the previous six world championships. When Willemsen missed a number of races because of injury, Jan Hendrickx, his cousin, took the lead in the competition. At the German GP at Strassbessenbach, Joris took out his first race win and also his first Grand Prix victory. With one event, the GP at Rudersberg, to go, Joris Hendrickx and Kaspars Liepins were 13 points behind the leaders Jan Hendrickx / Tim Smeuninx, in second place, but the leading combination suffered an engine defect in round four of the first race in Germany and lost all its advantage. A win and a second place in the last event earned the Belgian / Latvian combination the world title, with Joris Hendrickx becoming only the second Belgian to do so, after Sven Verbrugge, and the first Belgian driver to record this achievement.

In 2010, Hendrickx came second in the world championship, missing out on defending the title by nine points. He won the national Belgian title for a third consecutive time however. He suffered a season-ending injury at the qualifying of the German Grand Prix in July 2011, being able to compete in the race but requiring surgery afterwards. Consequently, the team only finished ninth in the overall standings at the end of the season.

The team was able to complete the 2012 season without injury and finished fourth in the world championship, 83 points behind Daniël Willemsen who won his tenth title. He also came second in the Belgian championship. At the end of the season Joris Hendrickx announced his retirement from the sport despite only being 28 years old, citing that he could not muster the energy and time required to compete in the World Championship.

Despite his announced retirement, Hendrickx still took part in non-GP sidecarcross races, winning the event in Muri, Switzerland in 2013. He also initially declared that he would start at the Belgian and French GP's in 2013, but did not compete in either event. Instead, Hendrickx raced the French national championship which he, still with Kaspars Liepiņš as his passenger, won.

In the 2014 season, Hendrickx competed in only a few selected races of the French championship, with Liepiņš as his passenger, but still as a top contender. The following season the pair won the German championship.

=== Season by season ===
Joris Hendrickx's sidecarcross world championship statistics:

Season	Passenger	Equipment	Position	Points	Races	Wins	Second	Third
2003	(Belgium) Roger van de Lagemaat		42	10	2	—	—	—
2004	(Belgium) Roger van de Lagemaat	MTH-BSU	11	211	26	—	—	—
2005	(Belgium) Roger van de Lagemaat	MTH-BSU	8	143	14	—	—	—
2005	(Belgium) Eli Piccart	MTH-BSU	8	55	8	—	—	—
2006	(Belgium) Eli Piccart	KTM-AYR	7	180	16	—	—	1
2007	(Belgium) Eli Piccart	KTM-AYR	8	177	16	—	—	1
2008	(Latvia) Kaspars Liepins	KTM-AYR	4	394	24	—	2	2
2009	(Latvia) Kaspars Liepins	KTM-VMC	1	483	26	2	7	10
2010	(Latvia) Kaspars Liepins	KTM-VMC	2	547	28	6	12	2
2011	(Latvia) Kaspars Liepins	KTM-VMC	9	315	16	2	6	2
2012	(Latvia) Kaspars Liepins	KTM-VMC	4	369	22	1	3	7
	Overall 2003–2012			2,884	198	11	30	25

Source:"The John Davey Pages - JORIS HENDRICKX". John Davey.

- Passengers in italics.

== Honours ==
=== World Championship ===
- Champions: (1) 2009
- Runners-up: (1) 2010

=== Belgium ===
- Champions: (3) 2008, 2009, 2010

=== France ===
- Champions: (1) 2013

=== Germany ===
- Champions: (1) 2015

Sporting positions
Preceded by Daniël Willemsen	Sidecarcross World Champion; 2009	Succeeded by Daniël Willemsen
Preceded by Daniël Willemsen	Belgian national sidecarcross champion 2008–2010	Succeeded by Jan Hendrickx
Preceded by Valentin Giraud	French national sidecarcross champion 2013	Succeeded by Valentin Giraud
Preceded by Andy Bürgler	German national sidecarcross champion 2015	Incumbent
