= 2004 Sidecarcross World Championship =

Season
- Grands Prix: 14
- Duration: 21 March–5 September

Drivers
- Champions: (Netherlands) Daniël Willemsen (Latvia) Kaspars Stupelis
- Sidecarcross des Nations: Germany

The 2004 FIM Sidecarcross World Championship, the 25th edition of the competition, started on 21 March 2004 and finished after fourteen race weekends on 5 September 2004 with Daniël Willemsen and Kaspars Stupelis taking out the title once more. For Willemsen, it was his third world championship while it was the second for Stupelis.

The season saw the cancellation of the Russian GP in Moscow on 15 August because of heavy rainfall, thereby reducing the schedule to thirteen GP's and 26 races.

== Overview ==
The 2004 season was the 25th edition of the Sidecarcross World Championship. It resulted in a third world championship for Daniël Willemsen, his second in a row with passenger Kaspars Stupelis. Five time world champion Kristers Sergis, with Sven Verbrugge as his passenger, was their main rival early on in the competition. An injury to Sergis meant however, the pair would miss five race weekends and be out of contention for the championship. After this, Willemsen and Stupelis won the championship almost undisputed with second-placed Marko Happich more than 150 points behind in second place. For the following season, 2005, Willemsen and Sergis would exchange passenger, with Sven Verbrugge returning to Willemsen, who he had raced with before, while Sergis and Stupelis would form an all-Latvian team.

The fourteen GP's of the season were held in eleven countries, Spain, France (2x), Netherlands, Germany (2x), Italy, Estonia, Latvia (2x), Croatia, Bulgaria, Russia and Belgium. It was the first time that a GP was to be held in Russia.

== Format ==
Every Grand Prix weekend is split into two races, both held on the same day. This means, the 2004 season with its fourteen Grand Prix had originally 28 races. Each race lasts for 30 minutes plus two laps. The two races on a weekend actually get combined to determine an overall winner. While this overall winners receives no extra WC points, they usually are awarded a special trophy.

The first twenty teams of each race score competition points. The point system for the 2004 season was as follows:

Place	Points
1	25
2	22
3	20
4	18
5	16
6	15
7	14
8	13
9	12
10	11

Place	Points
11	10
12	9
13	8
14	7
15	6
16	5
17	4
18	3
19	2
20	1

== Retirements ==
At the end of the 2004 season a number of long-term competitors retired from the World Championship, the most successful of those being Estonian Are Kaurit, with a third place in 2004 as his best result and active since 1993, and Dutch Wilfred van Werven, third placed in 2002 and 2003 and active since 1996.

== Calendar ==
The calendar for the 2004 season:

Date	Place	Race winners	GP winner	Source
21 March	(Spain) Talavera	(Latvia) Kristers Sergis / Sven Verbrugge	(Latvia) Kristers Sergis / Sven Verbrugge	Result
21 March	(Spain) Talavera	(Netherlands) Daniel Willemsen / Kaspars Stupelis	(Latvia) Kristers Sergis / Sven Verbrugge	Result
4 April	(France) Castelnau	(Latvia) Kristers Sergis / Sven Verbrugge	(Latvia) Kristers Sergis / Sven Verbrugge	Result
4 April	(France) Castelnau	(Latvia) Kristers Sergis / Sven Verbrugge	(Latvia) Kristers Sergis / Sven Verbrugge	Result
12 April	(Netherlands) Oldebroek	(Latvia) Kristers Sergis / Sven Verbrugge	(Netherlands) Daniel Willemsen / Kaspars Stupelis	Result
12 April	(Netherlands) Oldebroek	(Netherlands) Daniel Willemsen / Kaspars Stupelis	(Netherlands) Daniel Willemsen / Kaspars Stupelis	Result
25 April	(Germany) Aufenau	(Latvia) Kristers Sergis / Sven Verbrugge	(Netherlands) Daniel Willemsen / Kaspars Stupelis	Result
25 April	(Germany) Aufenau	(Netherlands) Daniel Willemsen / Kaspars Stupelis	(Netherlands) Daniel Willemsen / Kaspars Stupelis	Result
9 May	(Italy) Asti	(Netherlands) Daniel Willemsen / Kaspars Stupelis	(Netherlands) Daniel Willemsen / Kaspars Stupelis	Result
9 May	(Italy) Asti	(Netherlands) Daniel Willemsen / Kaspars Stupelis	(Netherlands) Daniel Willemsen / Kaspars Stupelis	Result
31 May	(France) Brou	(Netherlands) Daniel Willemsen / Kaspars Stupelis	(Netherlands) Daniel Willemsen / Kaspars Stupelis	Result
31 May	(France) Brou	(Netherlands) Daniel Willemsen / Kaspars Stupelis	(Netherlands) Daniel Willemsen / Kaspars Stupelis	Result
6 June	(Germany) Pflückuff	(Netherlands) Daniel Willemsen / Kaspars Stupelis	(Netherlands) Daniel Willemsen / Kaspars Stupelis	Result
6 June	(Germany) Pflückuff	(Netherlands) Daniel Willemsen / Kaspars Stupelis	(Netherlands) Daniel Willemsen / Kaspars Stupelis	Result
13 June	(Estonia) Jaanikese	(Netherlands) Daniel Willemsen / Kaspars Stupelis	(Netherlands) Daniel Willemsen / Kaspars Stupelis	Result
13 June	(Estonia) Jaanikese	(Netherlands) Daniel Willemsen / Kaspars Stupelis	(Netherlands) Daniel Willemsen / Kaspars Stupelis	Result
20 June	(Latvia) Cēsis	(Russia) Evgeny Scherbinin / Sergey Sosnovskikh	(Netherlands) Daniel Willemsen / Kaspars Stupelis	Result
20 June	(Latvia) Cēsis	(Netherlands) Daniel Willemsen / Kaspars Stupelis	(Netherlands) Daniel Willemsen / Kaspars Stupelis	Result
11 July	(Croatia) Zabok	(Netherlands) Daniel Willemsen / Kaspars Stupelis	(Germany) Marko Happich / Thomas Weinmann	Result
11 July	(Croatia) Zabok	(Germany) Marko Happich / Thomas Weinmann	(Germany) Marko Happich / Thomas Weinmann	Result
18 July	(Bulgaria) Samokov	(Netherlands) Daniel Willemsen / Kaspars Stupelis	(Netherlands) Daniel Willemsen / Kaspars Stupelis	Result
18 July	(Bulgaria) Samokov	(Netherlands) Daniel Willemsen / Kaspars Stupelis	(Netherlands) Daniel Willemsen / Kaspars Stupelis	Result
8 August	(Latvia) Ķegums	(Latvia) Kristers Sergis / Sven Verbrugge	(Germany) Marko Happich / Thomas Weinmann	Result
8 August	(Latvia) Ķegums	(Netherlands) Daniel Willemsen / Kaspars Stupelis	(Germany) Marko Happich / Thomas Weinmann	Result
15 August	(Russia) Moscow	cancelled ^{1}		
5 September	(Belgium) Neeroeteren	(Netherlands) Daniel Willemsen / Kaspars Stupelis	(Netherlands) Daniel Willemsen / Kaspars Stupelis	Result
5 September	(Belgium) Neeroeteren	(Netherlands) Daniel Willemsen / Kaspars Stupelis	(Netherlands) Daniel Willemsen / Kaspars Stupelis	Result
19 September	(Germany) Rudersberg	Germany		

- The Sidecarcross des Nations is a non-championship event but part of the calendar and is denoted by a light blue background in the table above.
- Flags for passengers not shown.
- ^{1} Cancelled after heavy rain, only an exhibition race was held, won by Marco Happich / Thomas Weinmann, which didn't count towards the world championship.

== Classification ==
=== Riders ===
Out of 56 teams in the points, the top-twenty of the 2004 season were:

	Driver / Passenger	Equipment	No.	Points	GP wins	GP 2nd	GP 3rd	Race wins	Race 2nd	Race 3rd
1	(Netherlands) Daniel Willemsen / (Latvia) Kaspars Stupelis	Zabel-VMC	1	572	9	1	1	18	4	1
2	(Germany) Marko Happich / Thomas Weinmann	Zabel-VMC	7	419	2	4	1	1	8	6
3	(Estonia) Are Kaurit / Jurgen Jakk	KTM-AYR	4	391	—	1	1	—	3	3
4	(Russia) Evgeni Scherbinin / Sergei Sosnovskikh	Zabel-APZ	11	385	—	2	2	1	3	4
5	(United Kingdom) Stuart Brown / Luke Peters	Zabel-VMC	5	374	—	2	3	—	4	3
6	(Netherlands) Eric Schrijver / Christian Verhagen	MTH-EML	10	274	—	—	—	—	—	1
7	(Latvia) Kristers Serģis / (Belgium) Sven Verbrugge	MTH-BSU	2	246	2	2	1	6	1	2
8	(Germany) Werner Wittmann / (Czech Republic) Premsyl Novotny	Yamaha-AYR	12	231	—	—	1	—	—	3
9	(Belgium) Jan Hendrickx / Tim Smeuninx	MTH-BSU	6	224	—	—	—	—	—	—
10	(Austria) Bertram Martin / (Switzerland) Bruno Kaelin	Zabel-VMC	14	215	—	—	—	—	—	—
11	(Belgium) Joris Hendrickx / Roger van de Lagemaat	MTH-BSU	41	211	—	—	—	—	—	—
12	(Germany) Frank Hofmann / (Belgium) Ludo Somers	Zabel-VMC	16	203	—	—	—	—	—	—
13	(Netherlands) Marcel Willemsen / Rene Boon	KTM-VMC	32	191	—	—	—	—	—	—
14	(Switzerland) Andy Burglar / Meinrad Schelbert	KTM-Spatech	25	164	—	—	1	—	1	—
15	(France) Benoit Beaumont / (Netherlands) Henry van de Wiel	MTH-BSU	8	142	—	—	1	—	—	2
16	(Latvia) Māris Rupeiks / Haralds Kurpnieks	Zabel-AYR	9	124	—	—	—	—	—	—
17	(Sweden) Henrik Soderquist / Tobias Sylwan	KTM-VMC	26	122	—	1	1	—	2	1
18	(Germany) Josef Brustmann / Stefan Urich	KTM-NMP	20	100	—	—	—	—	—	—
19	(Netherlands) Carlo van Duijnhoven / Tom van Duijnhoven	MTH-BSU	13	99	—	—	—	—	—	—
20	(Belgium) Nicky Pulinx / Dagwin Sabbe	KTM-VMC	118	96	—	—	—	—	—	—

- Equipment listed is motor and frame.
