= Plomion =

- Commune
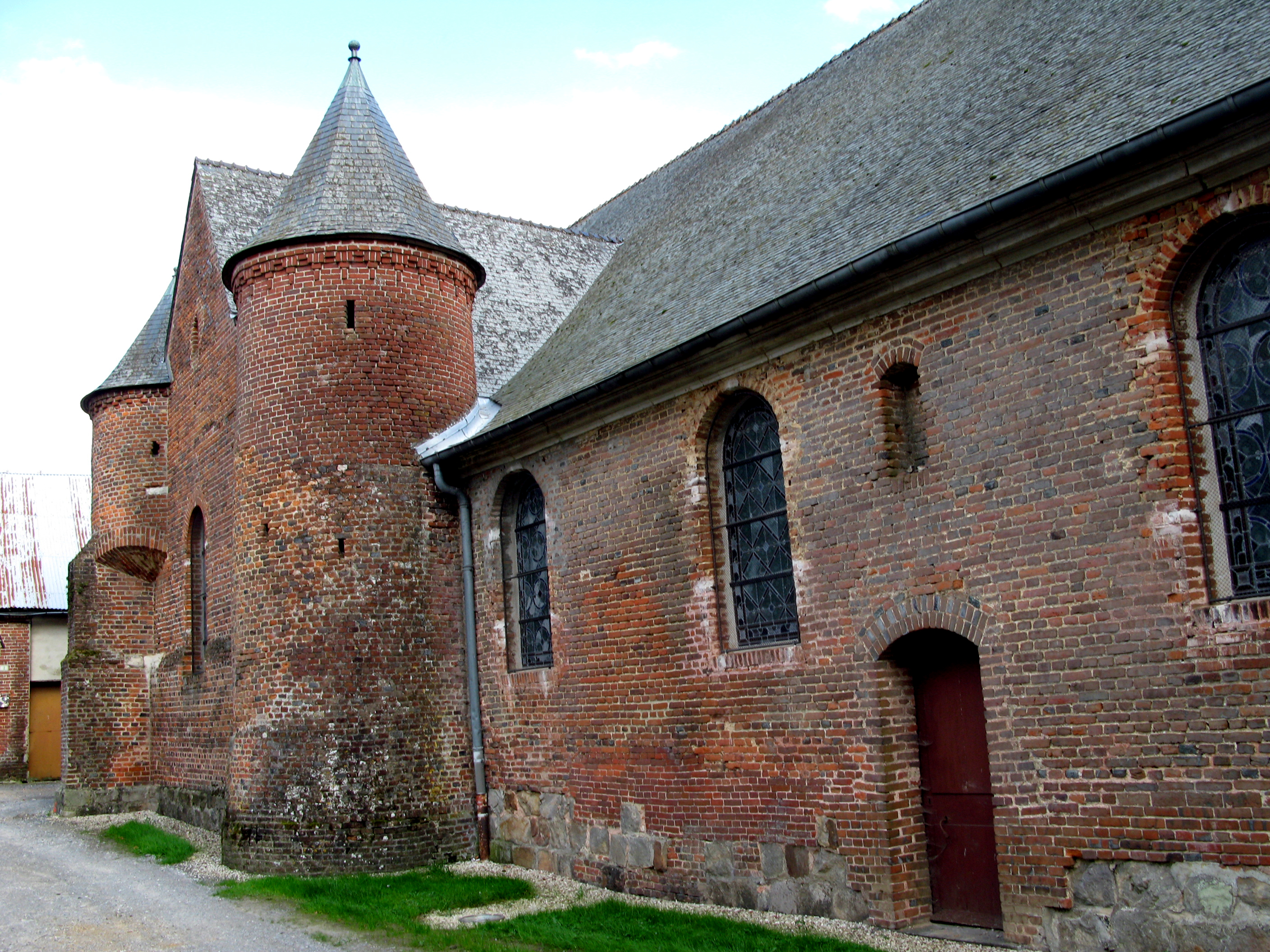
- The church of Plomion
- Location of Plomion
- Location within France Location within Hauts-de-France
- Coordinates: 49°48′31″N 4°01′08″E
- Country: France
- Region: Hauts-de-France
- Department: Aisne
- Arrondissement: Vervins
- Canton: Vervins
- Intercommunality: Thiérache du Centre

Government
  - Mayor (2026–32): Mireille Bonnemaison
- Area^{1}: 16.39 km^{2} (6.33 sq mi)
- Elevation: 200 m (660 ft)
- Highest elevation: 226 m (741 ft)
- Lowest elevation: 132 m (433 ft)
- Population (2023): 432
  - Density: 26.4/km^{2} (68.3/sq mi)
- Time zone: UTC+01:00 (CET)
  - Summer (DST): UTC+02:00 (CEST)
- INSEE/Postal code: 02608 /02140
- ^{1} French Land Register data, which excludes lakes, ponds, glaciers > 1 km^{2} (0.386 sq mi or 247 acres) and river estuaries.

Plomion (French pronunciation: [plɔmjɔ̃]) is a commune in the Aisne department in Hauts-de-France in northern France.

== History ==
Plomion was the site of a massacre by retreating German forces on the evening of August 31, 1944 as the American army approached pushing toward the Belgian border. Sixty German Waffen SS members who had been quartered in the village for six days, murdered fourteen men rounded-up at random and shot them with machine guns after lining them up in a meadow prior to retreating. Five men from a single family were dragged from their home during supper. The ages of the victims ranged from 70 to 17. After murdering the men, they set part of the town on fire. American troops arrived the following morning and their early arrival was credited by residents with preventing further murders.

== Population ==
Historical population
Year	Pop.	±% p.a.
1968	681	—
1975	630	−1.11%
1982	511	−2.95%
1990	527	+0.39%
1999	518	−0.19%
2007	500	−0.44%
2012	463	−1.53%
2017	462	−0.04%
2023	432	−1.11%
Source: INSEE

== Sport ==
Plomion has been host to the French Sidecarcross Grand Prix in the past and hosted it again in 2010, on 2 May.

== See also ==
- Communes of the Aisne department
