= Vruwink MotorCycles =

Sidecarcross frame manufacturer

The Vruwink MotorCycles company, short VMC, is a Dutch Sidecarcross frame manufacturer, having won eleven riders and six manufacturers world championships in this sport.

== Company history ==
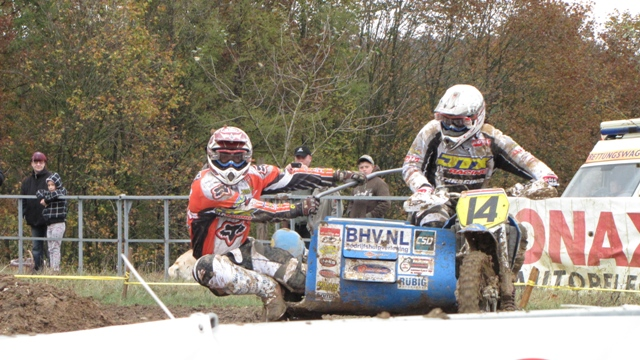
The VMC of Eric Schrijver in the German championship in 2009

VMC was formed in 1984 by a Dutchman of the name Vruwink, who gave the company its name. The company had and has only two employees and is specialised in making sidecarcross frames.

In 1995, VMC was bought by a Belgian with the name of Bakens, who still owns it as of 2008.

As of the end of 2010, the company has eleven rider's world championships to its name. From 2004 to 2009, the company also won six manufacturers' championships in a row and a seventh one in 2011.

== Honours ==
- Manufacturers World Championships: (7) 2004–09, 2011
- Riders world championships (11)
  - Christoph Hüsser / Andreas Hüsser; KTM-VMC 1988, 1989
  - Andreas Fuhrer / Adrian Käser; Kawasaki-VMC 1993, 1994
  - Daniël Willemsen / Kaspars Stupelis; Zabel-VMC 2003, 2004
  - Daniël Willemsen / Sven Verbrugge; Zabel-VMC 2005, 2006
  - Daniël Willemsen / Reto Grütter; Zabel-VMC 2007, 2008
  - Joris Hendrickx / Kaspars Liepiņš; KTM-VMC 2009
