= AYR (sidecarcross) =

- Manufacturer: AYR Racing
- Production: 1990–present
- Class: Sidecarcross frame

AYR is an Estonian manufacturer of sidecarcross frames that competes in the Sidecarcross World Championship.

The most prominent team in the 2008 world championship to use an AYR frame is the former world champions Kristers Sergis and Kaspars Stupelis. AYR has yet to win a world championship.

== History ==
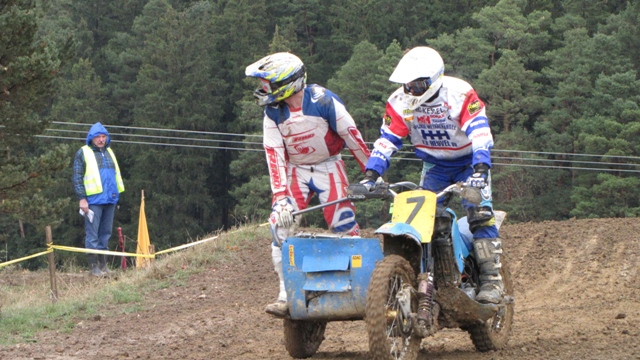
The AYR of Alois Wenninger in the German championship in 2009

The company was formed by Are Kaurit, a former sidecarcross passenger. He started building frames with Jürgen Jakk in 1990 and, from 1996, with Ülo Ausmees.

Kaurit, together with Arvo Laksberg and later Jürgen Jakk, entered the world championship on an AYR frame, where he achieved seven top-ten finishes until 2004. From 2001, a number of other successful teams also used the frame.

Ülo Ausmees was killed in a road accident in 2002 and AYR's production of sidecarcross frames came temporarily to a halt. The company recovered and continued to manufacture frames.
