= Rudersberg =

- Municipality
- Coat of arms

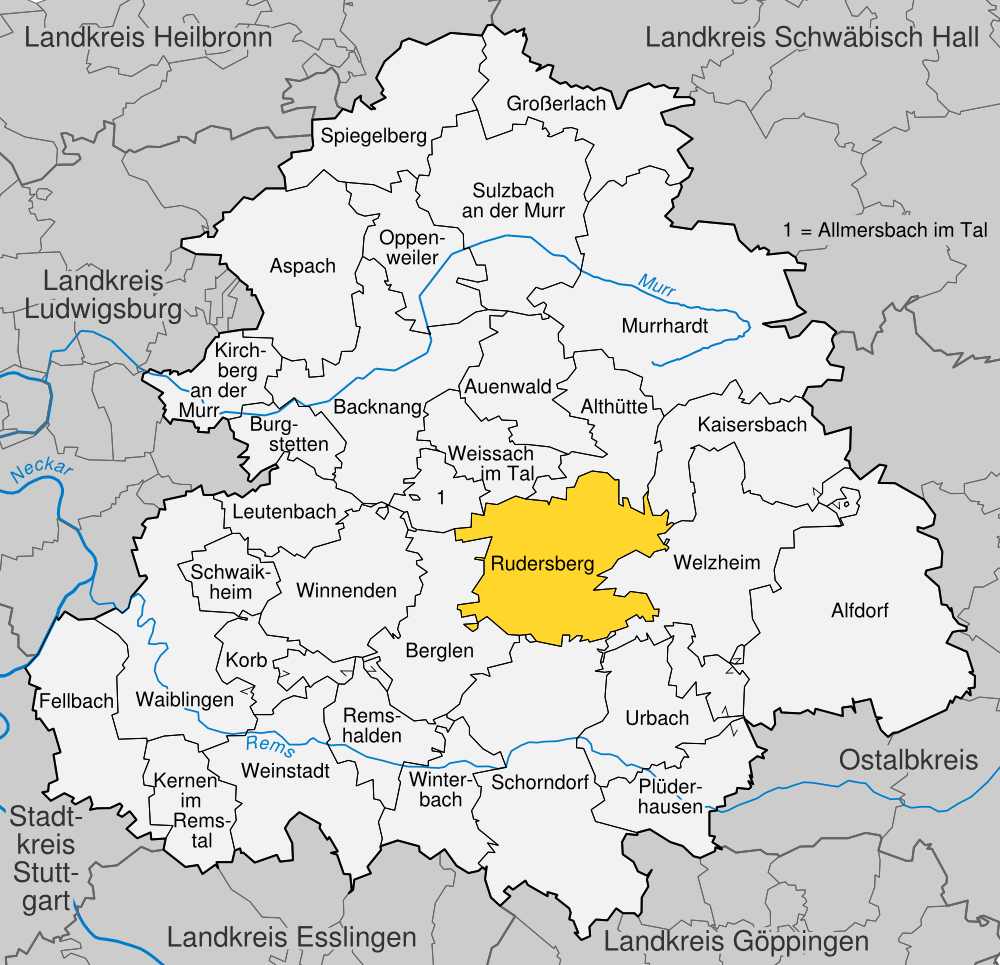
- Location of Rudersberg within Rems-Murr-Kreis district
- Interactive map of Rudersberg
- Location within Germany Location within Baden-Württemberg
- Coordinates: 48°53′08″N 09°31′41″E
- Country: Germany
- State: Baden-Württemberg
- Admin. region: Stuttgart
- District: Rems-Murr-Kreis

Government
  - Mayor (2018–26): Raimon Ahrens

Area
  - Total: 39.37 km^{2} (15.20 sq mi)
- Elevation: 279 m (915 ft)

Population (2025-12-31)
  - Total: 11,543
  - Density: 293.2/km^{2} (759.4/sq mi)
- Time zone: UTC+01:00 (CET)
  - Summer (DST): UTC+02:00 (CEST)
- Postal codes: 73635
- Dialling codes: 07183
- Vehicle registration: WN
- Website: www.rudersberg.de

Rudersberg is a municipality in the Rems-Murr district, in Baden-Württemberg, Germany. It is located 10 km southeast of Backnang, and 28 km northeast of Stuttgart.

== Sport ==
The local motocross club MSC Wieslauftal operates a track near Rudersberg which has in the past been used for Sidecarcross World Championship races. The race has been the final round of the calendar since 2005 and will do so again in 2010, on 12 September.
