= 2000 Sidecarcross World Championship =

Season
- Grands Prix: 13
- Duration: 19 March 2000–24 September 2000

Drivers
- Champions: (Latvia) Kristers Serģis (Latvia) Artis Rasmanis

The 2000 FIM Sidecarcross World Championship, the 21st edition of the competition, started on 19 March and finished after thirteen Grand Prix on 24 September 2000.

The championship was won by Kristers Serģis and his passenger Artis Rasmanis from Latvia, thereby winning their third World Championship together. The pair won the competition with a margin of 32 points, with Dutch rider Daniël Willemsen and his Belgian passenger Sven Verbrugge coming second. Willemsen was the defending champion, having won the 1999 World Championship with his brother Marcel as passenger. Marcel Willemsen was unable to compete in the 2000 edition because of injury. Third place went to the German combination Klaus and Thomas Weinmann. All up, 50 teams were classified in the overall standings with last place going to the Russian team of Anatoli Daineh and Aleksey Bessarabov.

The Sidecarcross World Championship, first held in 1980 and organised by the Fédération Internationale de Motocyclisme, is an annual competition. All races, manufacturers, and the vast majority of riders in the competition being in and from Europe. Sidecarcross is similar to motocross except that the teams consist of two riders, a driver and a passenger. Races are held on the same tracks as solo motocross but the handling of the machines differs as sidecars don't lean. The majority of physical work in the sport is carried out by the passenger, who speeds up the sidecarcross in corners by leaning out. The coordination between the driver and the passenger are therefore of highest importance.

== Overview ==
The thirteen races of the season were held in ten countries, Germany (2x), France (2x), Latvia (2x), Estonia, Belarus, Belgium, Sweden, Great Britain, Switzerland and the Netherlands. In comparison to the 1999 edition which had twelve Grand Prix, the Grand Prix of the Greece, Czech Republic and Ukraine had been dropped from the calendar while the GP's of Belarus and Sweden had been added and both France and Germany receiving a second Grand Prix.

Events typically consist of a qualifying competition, held in multiple stages on Saturdays of a race weekend while the two race events are typically held on Sundays. One exception to this rule is Easter weekends, when the races are held on Easter Monday. Race weekends can consist of additional motocross or quart support races as well, but the FIM stipulates that the World Championship races have priority. Riders have to be provided with at least one 30 minute free practice session, which will be timed. A race can consist of up to 30 starters and the qualifying modus is dependent on the number of entries. Up to 32 entries, it will be held in one group split into two sessions of 30 minutes each. Above 32 entries, the starter field will be sub-divided into two groups through ballot and the current standings. Each qualifying group can consist of up to 30 racers. Should there be more than 60 entries, a pre-qualifying has to be held. Of the riders in the two groups, the top-twelve directly qualify for the races. The remaining teams then go to a second-chance qualifying, in which the best six advance. The riders placed seventh and eighth remain in reserve should one of the qualified teams not be able to participate.

The points system used in 2000 was the same as had been in use since 1984 with the best fifteen teams receiving points in every race and the race winner receiving 20 points. It was the last time this system was used, with changes being made to it in 2002 and, again, in 2003:

Place	Points
1	20
2	17
3	15
4	13
5	11

Place	Points
6	10
7	9
8	8
9	7
10	6

Place	Points
11	5
12	4
13	3
14	2
15	1

== Retirements ==
At the end of the 2000 season a number of long-term competitors retired from the World Championship, the most successful of those being German Alois Wenninger, runners-up in 1997 and active since 1992.

== Calendar ==
The calendar for the 2001 season:

Date	Place	Race winners	GP winner	Source
19 March	(France) Toulon-sur-Arroux	(France) David Barat / Sebastien Bellaud	(France) David Barat / Sebastien Bellaud	Result
19 March	(France) Toulon-sur-Arroux	(Germany) Klaus Weinmann / Thomas Weinmann	(France) David Barat / Sebastien Bellaud	Result
24 April	(Switzerland) Frauenfeld	(United Kingdom) Chris Etheridge / John Chambers	(Netherlands) Daniël Willemsen / Sven Verbrugge	Result
24 April	(Switzerland) Frauenfeld	(Netherlands) Daniël Willemsen / Sven Verbrugge	(Netherlands) Daniël Willemsen / Sven Verbrugge	Result
6 June	(France) Château-du-Loir	(Latvia) Kristers Serģis / Artis Rasmanis	(Latvia) Kristers Serģis / Artis Rasmanis	Result
6 June	(France) Château-du-Loir	(Germany) Alois Wenninger / Henry van de Wiel	(Latvia) Kristers Serģis / Artis Rasmanis	Result
25 June	(Belarus) Volkovysk	(Latvia) Kristers Serģis / Artis Rasmanis	(Latvia) Kristers Serģis / Artis Rasmanis	Result
25 June	(Belarus) Volkovysk	(Latvia) Kristers Serģis / Artis Rasmanis	(Latvia) Kristers Serģis / Artis Rasmanis	Result
2 July	(Germany) Pflückuff	(Netherlands) Daniël Willemsen / Sven Verbrugge	(Netherlands) Daniël Willemsen / Sven Verbrugge	Result
2 July	(Germany) Pflückuff	(Germany) Alois Wenninger / Henry van de Wiel	(Netherlands) Daniël Willemsen / Sven Verbrugge	Result
16 July	(Belgium) Neeroeteren	(Netherlands) Daniël Willemsen / Sven Verbrugge	(Latvia) Kristers Serģis / Artis Rasmanis	Result
16 July	(Belgium) Neeroeteren	(Latvia) Kristers Serģis / Artis Rasmanis	(Latvia) Kristers Serģis / Artis Rasmanis	Result
30 July	(Latvia) Ķegums	(Sweden) Henrik Söderqvist / Tobias Sylwan	(Sweden) Henrik Söderqvist / Tobias Sylwan	Result
30 July	(Latvia) Ķegums	(Sweden) Henrik Söderqvist / Tobias Sylwan	(Sweden) Henrik Söderqvist / Tobias Sylwan	Result
8 August	(Estonia) Jaanikese	(Germany) Klaus Weinmann / Thomas Weinmann	(Germany) Klaus Weinmann / Thomas Weinmann	Result
8 August	(Estonia) Jaanikese	(Latvia) Kristers Serģis / Artis Rasmanis	(Germany) Klaus Weinmann / Thomas Weinmann	Result
27 August	(Sweden) Varberg	(Sweden) Henrik Söderqvist / Tobias Sylwan	(Sweden) Henrik Söderqvist / Tobias Sylwan	Result
27 August	(Sweden) Varberg	(Sweden) Henrik Söderqvist / Tobias Sylwan	(Sweden) Henrik Söderqvist / Tobias Sylwan	Result
3 September	(United Kingdom) Canada Heights	(Latvia) Kristers Serģis / Artis Rasmanis	(Netherlands) Daniël Willemsen / Sven Verbrugge	Result
3 September	(United Kingdom) Canada Heights	(Netherlands) Daniël Willemsen / Sven Verbrugge	(Netherlands) Daniël Willemsen / Sven Verbrugge	Result
10 September	(Netherlands) Lierop	(Sweden) Henrik Söderqvist / Tobias Sylwan	(Netherlands) Jacky Janssen / Wiljam Janssen	Result
10 September	(Netherlands) Lierop	(Germany) Klaus Weinmann / Thomas Weinmann	(Netherlands) Jacky Janssen / Wiljam Janssen	Result
17 September	(Germany) Rudersberg	(Latvia) Kristers Serģis / Artis Rasmanis	(Latvia) Kristers Serģis / Artis Rasmanis	Result
17 September	(Germany) Rudersberg	canceled because of track conditions	(Latvia) Kristers Serģis / Artis Rasmanis	Result
24 September	(Latvia) Cēsis	(Germany) Klaus Weinmann / Thomas Weinmann	(Netherlands) Daniël Willemsen / Sven Verbrugge	Result
24 September	(Latvia) Cēsis	(Netherlands) Daniël Willemsen / Sven Verbrugge	(Netherlands) Daniël Willemsen / Sven Verbrugge	Result

- Flags for passengers not shown.

== Classification ==
=== Riders ===
The top ten teams in the final overall standings were:

Position	Driver / Passenger	Equipment	Bike No	Points
1	(Latvia) Kristers Serģis / Artis Rasmanis	MTH-BSU		352
2	(Netherlands) Daniel Willemsen / (Belgium) Sven Verbrugge	Zabel-BSU		320
3	(Germany) Klaus Weinmann / Thomas Weinmann	MTH-EML		306
4	(Germany) Alois Wenninger / (Netherlands) Henry van de Wiel	MTH-AYR		287
5	(Sweden) Henrik Söderqvist / Tobias Sylwan	MTH-EML		231
6	(Netherlands) Jacky Janssen / Wiljam Janssen	Zabel-EML		222
7	(Estonia) Are Kaurit / Arvo Laksberg	MTH-AYR		196
8	(France) David Barat / Sebastien Bellaud	MTH-EML		136
9	(Estonia) Alvar Korjus / Jurgen Jakk	MTH-AYR		134
10	(Germany) Marko Happich / Sebastian Boehme	MTH-EML		107

- Equipment listed is motor and frame.
