= Marcel Willemsen =

Dutch sidecarcross rider (born 1977)

- Nationality: Netherlands
- Born: May 28, 1977 (age 49); Lochem, Netherlands
- Bike number: 20
- Website: Marcel Willemsens official website
Motorcycle racing career statistics
Sidecarcross World Championship
Active years	1995 - 1999 2001 - Present
Manufacturers	Honda-EML (1995) Zabel-EML (1996) Zabel-BSU (1997-1999) Zabel-VMC (2000) KTM-VMC (2003-2005) Zabel-VMC (2006) Zabel-BSU (2007) Zabel-WSP (2008-2011) Zabel-MEFO (2012) Zabel-WSP (2013-present)
Championships	(1) 1999
2015 championship position	20th
Starts / Wins / Podiums / Poles / F. laps / Points; 275 / 26 / 48 / / / 2,464

Marcel Willemsen (born 28 May 1977 in Lochem, Gelderland) is a Dutch sidecarcross passenger and 1999 World Champion.

Willemsen won the 1999 world championship as the passenger for his older brother, the seven-time world champion Daniël Willemsen. After this, he left his brothers team and started racing as a sidecarcross driver himself, competing in the Dutch and the world championship.

Willemsen is married and has three children, living in Lochem. In 2007, he announced that 2008 would be his last season as a GP rider, retiring from the international competition but took part in a limited number of races in the following seasons and raced a full season again in 2012.

== Sidecarcross world championship results ==
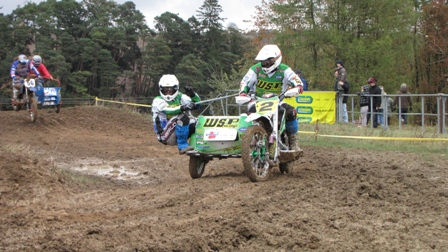
Marcel Willemsen & Bruno Kaelin in the German championship in 2009

Marcel started racing with his brother Daniël in the world championship in 1995. As a passenger, his first world championship race was the Dutch GP in Markelo on 24 September 1995, which is the only one he raced in that season. The two brothers quickly improved and the next season saw their first win, at the French GP in Baugé on 12 May 1996. From season to season they improved, culminating in a one-point win of the world championship in 1999. Marcel suffered serious injuries in a training run in February 2000, finding himself temporarily paralysed and unable to continue racing.

Willemsen made a surprising recovery within ten months and returned to the sidecarcross world championship in 2001, now as a driver, with his countryman Rene Boon as passenger. Marcel could however not achieve the same success there as he had with his brother, a tenth overall finish in 2006 being his strongest season result. Three fifth-place finishes in races were his best results in individual events. The 2008 season, now with his German passenger Marco Godau, was to be his last as an international rider, but he may continue to race in the Dutch championship were his showings have been much stronger over the years. He did take part in the Dutch and Swiss GP with passenger Bruno Kaelin in 2009, achieving good results.

Willemsen mainly raced in the 2009 German Championship, where he finished second overall. In 2010, Willemsen participated in three Grand Prix once more, again with Bruno Kaelin as his passenger. In 2011, he took part in twelve races, using Gertie Eggink as his passenger, who had won the world championship in the previous year as passenger of Marcel's brother. With the same passenger in 2012, Willemsen finished in eighth place in the world championship, earning his first-ever podium finish as a driver at the first race of the 2012 Belgian GP.

In the 2013 season, Willemsen only took part in one event of the GP season, the first race of the Belgian GP, where he and his passenger Gertie Eggink came eleventh. The pair raced in five events in 2014 and came 20th overall, a result repeated in 2015.

=== Season by season ===
Season	Team	Equipment	Position	Points	Races	Wins	Second	Third
1995	(Netherlands) Daniël Willemsen	Honda-EML	25	10	2	—	—	—
1996	(Netherlands) Daniël Willemsen	Zabel—EML	12	82	16	2	—	—
1997	(Netherlands) Daniël Willemsen	Zabel-BSU	3	231	14	5	4	2
1998	(Netherlands) Daniël Willemsen	Zabel-BSU	2	279	18	6	7	2
1999	(Netherlands) Daniël Willemsen	Zabel-BSU	1	386	24	13	5	1
2001	(Netherlands) Rene Boon		19	44	14	—	—	—
2002	(Netherlands) Rene Boon	Zabel-VMC	16	144	26	—	—	—
2003	(Netherlands) Rene Boon	KTM-VMC	32	33	8	—	—	—
2004	(Netherlands) Rene Boon	KTM-VMC	13	181	8	—	—	—
2004	(Latvia) Harolds Kurpnicks	KTM-VMC	13	10	2	—	—	—
2005	(Netherlands) Bart Notten	KTM-VMC	13	132	18	—	—	—
2006	(Netherlands) Bjorn Roes	Zabel-VMC	10	137	12	—	—	—
2007	(Germany) Marco Godau	Zabel-BSU	17	82	16	—	—	—
2008	(Germany) Marco Godau	Zabel-WSP	11	208	24	—	—	—
2009	(Switzerland) Bruno Kaelin	Zabel-WSP	24	41	4	—	—	—
2010	(Switzerland) Bruno Kaelin	Zabel-WSP	25	46	6	—	—	—
2011	(Netherlands) Gertie Eggink	Zabel-WSP	21	58	12	—	—	—
2012	(Netherlands) Gertie Eggink	Zabel-MEFO	8	223	22	—	1	—
2013	(Netherlands) Gertie Eggink	Zabel-WSP	39	10	1	—	—	—
2014	(Netherlands) Gertie Eggink	Zabel-WSP	20	59	9	—	—	—
2015	(Netherlands) Bart Sloot	Zabel-WSP	20	78	21	—	—	—
	Overall 1995 - 2015			2,464	275	26	17	5

Source:"The John Davey Pages - Marcel Willemsen (passenger)". John Davey.

Source:"The John Davey Pages - Marcel Willemsen (driver)". John Davey.

- Passengers in italics.

== Honours ==
=== World Championship ===
- Champions: (1) 1999
- Runners-up: (1) 1998

=== Netherlands ===
- Champions: (2) 1998, 1999
- Runners-up: (1) 1997

Sporting positions
Preceded by Artis Rasmanis	Sidecarcross World Champion (passenger); 1999	Succeeded by Artis Rasmanis
Preceded by Wiljam Janssen	Dutch national sidecarcross champion (passenger); 1998, 1999	Succeeded by Wiljam Janssen
