= 2003 Sidecarcross World Championship =

Season
- Grands Prix: 13
- Duration: 6 April 2003–7 September 2003

Drivers
- Champions: (Netherlands) Daniël Willemsen (Latvia) Kaspars Stupelis
- Sidecarcross des Nations: Netherlands

The 2003 FIM Sidecarcross World Championship, the 24th edition of the competition, started on 6 April and finished after thirteen race weekends on 7 September 2003.

The defending champions were the Latvian's Kristers Sergis and Artis Rasmanis who had won their fifth title in 2002. The 2003 championship was won by Dutch rider Daniël Willemsen and his Latvian passenger Kaspars Stupelis who finished 60 points ahead of the defending champion Sergis and his new passenger Sven Verbrugge in second place. It was the second title for Willemsen, having previously been crowned World Champions in 1999 and the first for Stupelis.

The Sidecarcross World Championship, first held in 1980 and organised by the Fédération Internationale de Motocyclisme, is an annual competition. All races, manufacturers and the vast majority of riders in the competition being in and from Europe. Sidecarcross is similar to motocross except that the teams consist of two riders, a driver and a passenger. Races are held on the same tracks as solo motocross but the handling of the machines differs as sidecars don't lean. The majority of physical work in the sport is carried out by the passenger, who speeds up the sidecarcross in corners by leaning out. The coordination between the driver and the passenger are therefore of highest importance.

== Overview ==
The thirteen races of the season were held in nine countries, Spain, France (twice), Netherlands (2x), Romania, Bulgaria, Latvia (2x), Estonia, Germany (2x) and Belgium. In comparison to the 2002 edition, the Grand Prix of Sweden and Czech Republic had been dropped off the calendar while the Spanish and Romanian GP were added.

Events typically consist of a qualifying competition, held in multiple stages on Saturdays of a race weekend while the two race events are typically held on Sundays. One exception to this rule is Easter weekends, when the races are held on Easter Monday. Race weekends can consist of additional motocross or quart support races as well, but the FIM stipulates that the World Championship races have priority. Riders have to be provided with at least one 30 minute free practice season, which will be timed. A race can consist of up to 30 starters and the qualifying modus is dependent on the number of entries. With up to 32 entries, it will be held in one group split into two sessions of 30 minutes each. Above 32 entries, the starter field will be sub-divided into two groups through ballot and the current standings. Each qualifying group can consist of up to 30 racers. Should there be more than 60 entries, a pre-qualifying has to be held. Of the riders in the two groups, the top twelve directly qualify for the races. The remaining teams then go to a second-chance qualifying, in which the best six advance. The riders placed seventh and eighth remain in reserve should one of the qualified teams not be able to participate.

The first twenty teams of each race score competition points. The point system for the season was as follows:

Place	Points
1	25
2	22
3	20
4	18
5	16
6	15
7	14
8	13
9	12
10	11

Place	Points
11	10
12	9
13	8
14	7
15	6
16	5
17	4
18	3
19	2
20	1

== Calendar ==
The calendar for the 2003 season:

Date	Place	Race winners	GP winner	Source
6 April	(Spain) Talavera de la Reina	(Netherlands) Daniel Willemsen / Kaspars Stupelis	(Latvia) Kristers Sergis / Sven Verbrugge	Result
6 April	(Spain) Talavera de la Reina	(Latvia) Kristers Sergis / Sven Verbrugge	(Latvia) Kristers Sergis / Sven Verbrugge	Result
27 April	(France) Pernes-les-Fontaines	(Netherlands) Daniel Willemsen / Kaspars Stupelis	(Netherlands) Daniel Willemsen / Kaspars Stupelis	Result
27 April	(France) Pernes-les-Fontaines	(Netherlands) Daniel Willemsen / Kaspars Stupelis	(Netherlands) Daniel Willemsen / Kaspars Stupelis	Result
4 May	(France) Plomion	(Netherlands) Daniel Willemsen / Kaspars Stupelis	(Netherlands) Daniel Willemsen / Kaspars Stupelis	Result
4 May	(France) Plomion	(Netherlands) Daniel Willemsen / Kaspars Stupelis	(Netherlands) Daniel Willemsen / Kaspars Stupelis	Result
18 May	(Netherlands) Markelo	(Latvia) Kristers Sergis / Sven Verbrugge	(Latvia) Kristers Sergis / Sven Verbrugge	Result
18 May	(Netherlands) Markelo	(Latvia) Kristers Sergis / Sven Verbrugge	(Latvia) Kristers Sergis / Sven Verbrugge	Result
25 May	(Romania) Bucharest	(Latvia) Kristers Sergis / Sven Verbrugge	(Netherlands) Daniel Willemsen / Kaspars Stupelis	Result
25 May	(Romania) Bucharest	(Netherlands) Daniel Willemsen / Kaspars Stupelis	(Netherlands) Daniel Willemsen / Kaspars Stupelis	Result
1 June	(Bulgaria) Sevlievo	(Latvia) Kristers Sergis / Sven Verbrugge	(Latvia) Kristers Sergis / Sven Verbrugge	Result
1 June	(Bulgaria) Sevlievo	(Latvia) Kristers Sergis / Sven Verbrugge	(Latvia) Kristers Sergis / Sven Verbrugge	Result
15 June	(Latvia) Cēsis	(Latvia) Kristers Sergis / Sven Verbrugge	(Netherlands) Wilfred van Werven / Eli Piccart	Result
15 June	(Latvia) Cēsis	(Netherlands) Daniel Willemsen / Kaspars Stupelis	(Netherlands) Wilfred van Werven / Eli Piccart	Result
22 June	(Estonia) Jaanikese	(Latvia) Kristers Sergis / Sven Verbrugge	(Netherlands) Daniel Willemsen / Kaspars Stupelis	Result
22 June	(Estonia) Jaanikese	(Netherlands) Daniel Willemsen / Kaspars Stupelis	(Netherlands) Daniel Willemsen / Kaspars Stupelis	Result
13 July	(Germany) Pflückuff	(Latvia) Kristers Sergis / Sven Verbrugge	(Latvia) Kristers Sergis / Sven Verbrugge	Result
13 July	(Germany) Pflückuff	(Latvia) Kristers Sergis / Sven Verbrugge	(Latvia) Kristers Sergis / Sven Verbrugge	Result
3 August	(Belgium) Neeroeteren	(Latvia) Kristers Sergis / Sven Verbrugge	(France) Benoit Beaumont / Henry van de Wiel	Result
3 August	(Belgium) Neeroeteren	(Netherlands) Daniel Willemsen / Kaspars Stupelis	(France) Benoit Beaumont / Henry van de Wiel	Result
10 August	(Latvia) Ķegums	(Netherlands) Daniel Willemsen / Kaspars Stupelis	(Netherlands) Wilfred van Werven / Eli Piccart	Result
10 August	(Latvia) Ķegums	(Netherlands) Wilfred van Werven / Eli Piccart	(Netherlands) Wilfred van Werven / Eli Piccart	Result
24 August	(Netherlands) Lichtenvoorde	(Netherlands) Daniel Willemsen / Kaspars Stupelis	(Netherlands) Daniel Willemsen / Kaspars Stupelis	Result
24 August	(Netherlands) Lichtenvoorde	(Netherlands) Daniel Willemsen / Kaspars Stupelis	(Netherlands) Daniel Willemsen / Kaspars Stupelis	Result
7 September	(Germany) Beuern	(Netherlands) Daniel Willemsen / Kaspars Stupelis	(Latvia) Kristers Sergis / Sven Verbrugge	Result
7 September	(Germany) Beuern	(Latvia) Kristers Sergis / Sven Verbrugge	(Latvia) Kristers Sergis / Sven Verbrugge	Result
28 September	(Netherlands) Oss	Netherlands		

- The Sidecarcross des Nations is a non-championship event but part of the calendar and is denoted by a light blue background in the table above.
- Flags for passengers not shown.

== Classification ==
=== Riders ===
The top ten teams in the final overall standings were:

Position	Driver / Passenger	Equipment	Bike No	Points
1	(Netherlands) Daniel Willemsen / (Latvia) Kaspars Stupelis	Zabel-VMC	2	561
2	(Latvia) Kristers Serģis / (Belgium) Sven Verbrugge	MTH-BSU	1	501
3	(Netherlands) Wilfred van Werven / (Belgium) Eli Piccart	Zabel-BSU	3	382
4	(Estonia) Are Kaurit / Jurgen Jakk	KTM-AYR	4	381
5	(United Kingdom) Stuart Brown / Luke Peters	Zabel-VMC	6	342
6	(Belgium) Jan Hendrickx / Tim Smeuninx	MTH-BSU	32	308
7	(Germany) Marko Happich / (Netherlands) Gerwin Wijs	Zabel-VMC	5	301
8	(France) Benoit Beaumont / (Netherlands) Henry van de Wiel	MTH-BSU	10	292
9	(Latvia) Māris Rupeiks / Haralds Kurpnieks	Zabel-BSU	14	266
10	(Netherlands) Eric Schrijver / Christian Verhagen	MTH-EML	12	237

- Equipment listed is motor and frame.
