= Sven Verbrugge =

Belgian sidecarcross racer

- Nationality: Belgium
- Born: 21 August 1967 (age 59); Schoten, Belgium
- Bike number: 6
- Website: www.svenverbrugge.be
Motorcycle racing career statistics
Sidecarcross World Championship
Active years	1993 - 1997; 1999 - 2006; 2008 - 2012
Championships	(3) 2005, 2006, 2011
2012 championship position	3rd
Starts / Wins / Podiums / Poles / F. laps / Points; 327 / 89 / 155 / / / 4,717

Sven Verbrugge (Schoten, 21 August 1967) is a retired Belgian sidecarcross passenger and triple Sidecarcross World Champion, winning the title in 2005, 2006 and 2011.

Verbrugge started racing motocross in 1983 in the 125 cc solo class before becoming a sidecarcross passenger in 1986. In his career, he has raced for over 20 years in the Belgian, Dutch and the world sidecarcross championships. After his second world championship in 2006, Verbrugge retired from the world championship, but felt, according to himself, "homesick" for the GP circus and returned for the 2008 season alongside his countryman Nicky Pulinx.

Apart from two world championships, Verbrugge also won the Belgian title in 1993, 1994, 2004 and 2006 and the Dutch in 2001 and 2006.

== Sidecarcross world championship results ==
Verbrugge joined the sidecarcross world championship in 1993 as the passenger of his countryman Gunther Gooverts, whom he raced with quite successfully for four seasons. He made his debut at the French GP in Pernes Les Fontaines on 4 April 1993. He won his first race in this season in Roggenburg, Switzerland on 15 August 1993. In 1995, an ankle injury prevented him for three month from taking part in most of the season but the year after the pair returned with a sixth place overall finish. After those four seasons, Verbrugge had two lean ones with only four races in 1997 and none in 1998 after Gooverts choose not to take part in the world championship and only race in domestic events in Belgium. He raced successfully with two different drivers in 1999, Martin Gölz and Gerton Kops, who finished 12th and 9th overall this season. After a short stint with Peter Steegmans, he returned to Daniël Willemsen for a second time and the pair finished second overall in the 2000 and 2001 world championship. In 2002, apart from Willemsen, he also raced with Are Kaurit, with both drivers finishing in the top four. Another second-place finish, now with Kristers Serģis, in 2003, when his old partner Willemsen won the championship was followed by a seventh place in 2004 due to a three-month-long injury for Serģis. After this, the two drivers, Willemsen and Serģis, swooped partners, with Verbrugge returning to Willemsen for a third time and Kaspars Stupelis joining Serģis instead. This move proved very successful for Verbrugge as he managed to win two world championships with Willemsen. After the second one, Verbrugge left the world championship in 2006, seemingly for good, at the age of 39. After a year away from the GP circus however, he decided to return, now with his new partner, fellow Belgian Nicky Pulinx.

In 2009, Verbrugge was back as passenger of Daniël Willemsen once more, except in the first race of the season, when he raced with Gerrit van Werven. The pair dominated the early part of the season but an injury to Willemsen forced them to miss three events and a lack of good form upon return caused them to finish only fifth in the world championship. In the last event of the season, Verbrugge broke his thumb and the team was unable to score any points. Daniël Willemsen however declared already before the race that he would try to win title number eight in 2010.

After riding with fellow Belgian Peter Steegmans in 2010, Verbrugge started once more with Willemsen in 2011, after an injury to first-choice passenger Roman Vasyliaka. It is the fifth time that the two are racing together in the competition. As Willemsens passenger, Verbrugge has also won two Dutch national titles, in 2001 and 2006. Willemsen temporarily switched to Ondrej Cermak as his passenger for the first of two German GP's because of an injury to Verbrugge. Willemsen and his passenger clinched the World Championship at the second-last race of the season, at Slagelse, Denmark, having a 53-point lead over Latvians Jānis and Lauris Daiders at the time.

The last race event of the 2011 season saw the World Champions, Willemsen and Verbrugge, failing to score any points. A dispute during qualifying between the two lead to Verbrugge walking out during the first qualifying session. He later returned to take part in the "last chance", where the team qualified for the race after all. Verbrugge however was injured during a fall and had to be taken to hospital where his arm was placed into a plaster, ruling the team out of the race.

In the 2012 season, Verbrugge was racing with fellow Belgian pilot Ben Adriaenssen, finishing third in the world championship.

=== Season by season ===
Sven Verbrugge's season by season world championship results:

Season	Driver	Equipment	Position	Points	Races	Wins	Second	Third
1993	(Belgium) Gunther Gooverts	KTM-EML	11	182	27	2	—	3
1994	(Belgium) Gunther Gooverts	KTM-EML	8	135	18	1	2	1
1995	(Belgium) Gunther Gooverts	KTM-EML	21	27	8	—	—	1
1996	(Belgium) Gunther Gooverts	KTM-EML	6	155	16	—	3	2
1997	(Belgium) Gert Devoldere		23	3	2	—	—	—
1997	(Netherlands) Daniël Willemsen	Zabel-BSU	3	40	2	2	—	—
1999	(Germany) Martin Gölz	Zabel-VMC	12	90	20	—	—	—
1999	(Netherlands) Gerton Kops	MTH-EML	9	17	2	—	—	—
2000	(Belgium) Peter Steegmans	Zabel-EML	21	16	2	—	—	—
2000	(Netherlands) Daniël Willemsen	Zabel-BSU	2	320	22	5	4	7
2001	(Netherlands) Daniël Willemsen	Zabel-BSU	2	377	22	8	5	3
2002	(Estonia) Are Kaurit	MTH-AYR	4	268	16	—	3	2
2002	(Netherlands) Daniël Willemsen	Zabel-VMC	2	88	4	—	4	—
2003	(Latvia) Kristers Serģis	MTH-BSU	2	501	26	12	7	1
2004	(Latvia) Kristers Serģis	MTH-BSU	7	246	12	6	1	2
2004	(Germany) Frank Hofman	Zabel-VMC	12	22	2	—	—	—
2005	(Netherlands) Daniël Willemsen	Zabel-VMC	1	478	22	15	4	—
2006	(Netherlands) Daniël Willemsen	Zabel-VMC	1	341	16	13	—	—
2008	(Belgium) Nicky Pulinx	Zabel-VMC	9	22	4	—	—	—
2008	(Netherlands) Jarno van den Boomen	Zabel-VMC	22	8	2	—	—	—
2009	(Netherlands) Gerrit van Werven	KTM-VMC	16	6	2	—	—	—
2009	(Netherlands) Daniël Willemsen	Zabel-VMC	5	341	17	11	—	—
2010	(Belgium) Peter Steegmans	KTM-WSP	12	212	20	—	1	1
2011	(Netherlands) Daniël Willemsen	Zabel-WSP	1	437	21	14	3	—
2012	(Belgium) Ben Adriaenssen	KTM-WSP	3	385	22	—	—	6
	Overall 1993 - 2012			4,717	327	89	37	29

Source:"The John Davey Pages - Sven Verbrugge". John Davey.
- Passengers in italics.

== Honours ==
=== World Championship ===
- Champions: (3) 2005, 2006, 2011
- Runners-up: (4) 2000, 2001, 2002, 2003

=== Belgium ===
- Champions: (4) 1993, 1994, 2004, 2006

=== Netherlands ===
- Champions: (2) 2001, 2006

=== Germany ===
- Champions: (1) 2010

Sporting positions
Preceded by Kaspars Stupelis	Sidecarcross World Champion (passenger); 2005, 2006	Succeeded by Reto Grütter
Preceded by Gertie Eggink	Sidecarcross World Champion (passenger); 2011	Succeeded by Kenny van Gaalen
Preceded by Wiljam Janssen	Dutch national sidecarcross champion (passenger); 2001	Succeeded by Dagwin Sabbe
Preceded by Christian Verhagen	Dutch national sidecarcross champion (passenger); 2006	Succeeded by Reto Grütter
Preceded by Gino Strubbe	Belgian national sidecarcross champion (passenger); 1993 - 1994	Succeeded by Wiljam Janssen
Preceded by Christian Verhagen	Belgian national sidecarcross champion (passenger); 2004	Succeeded by Dimitri Vandeursen
Preceded by Dimitri Vandeursen	Belgian national sidecarcross champion (passenger); 2006	Succeeded by Reto Grütter
Preceded by Martin Betschart	German national sidecarcross champion (passenger); 2010–present	Incumbent
