= Kaspars Stupelis =

Latvian motorcycle racer

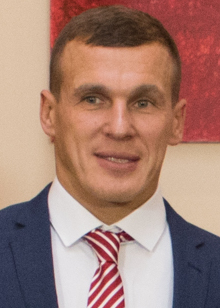
- Nationality: Latvia
- Born: 7 July 1982 (age 44); Cēsis, Latvian SSR, Soviet Union
- Bike number: 2
Motorcycle racing career statistics
Sidecarcross World Championship
Active years	2001 – present
Manufacturers	Zabel-AYR (2001–2002) Zabel-VMC (2003–2004) MTH-BSU (2005) KTM-Mefo (2006–2007) KTM-AYR (2008) Zabel-VMC (2009) KTM-WSP (2010) Zabel-WSP (2011–2012) Zabel-VMC (2013) Zabel-WSP (2014–present)
Championships	(3) 2003, 2004, 2015
2015 championship position	1st
Starts / Wins / Podiums / Poles / F. laps / Points; 299 / 92 / 187 / / / 5,301

Kaspars Stupelis (born 7 July 1982) is a Latvian sidecarcross passenger and quadruple World Champion.

Stupelis won the 2015 and 2019 World Championship as passenger of Etienne Bax. His previous two world championships were gained when being the passenger in Daniël Willemsen's team. In his time with Willemsen, he also won two Dutch titles in 2003 and 2004, an achievement repeated at the side of Bax in 2012, 2014 and 2015.

== Sidecarcross world championship results ==
Stupelis entered the sidecarcross world championship as a passenger for his fellow Latvian driver Modris Štelle in 2001. His first two seasons alongside Štelle were not particularly successful and it came as a surprise when the reigning world champion, Daniël Willemsen, picked him as his passenger for the 2003 season. The team was successful from the start, winning the first race of the season in Talavera de la Reina, Spain on 6 April 2003.

It was Stupelis' first race victory and he gained another 30 in this and the next season with Willemsen, winning two world titles in the process. Willemsen, who has exchanged passengers frequently over the years, did something of a swoop with Kristers Serģis after the 2004 season, with Stupelis joining his fellow Latvian former world champion and, in exchange, Sven Verbrugge from Belgium joining Willemsen from Serģis. The new pair Serģis / Stupelis finished second in the final standings in 2005, winning seven races.

2006 was not a good year for the combination and they only raced in two events, failing to win any of the four races they participated but achieving three podium finishes. In 2007, they were back, won their home GP and finished third overall, becoming the only team to snatch a victory from the world champion Willemsen. The duo continued to race and took part in the 2008 season, which was Serģis last.

In 2009, Stupelis was racing as passenger of Nicky Pulinx in the world championship, in 2010 he raced with fellow Latvian Maris Rupeiks. He missed the first two events of the 2011 season, being replaced by Elvis Mucenieks, but raced the remaining eleven Grand Prix with Rupeiks again. He had a much improved 2012 season on the side of Etienne Bax, finishing second in the world championship, only five points behind winners Daniël Willemsen. In 2013, the team Bax/Stupelis came second once more in the world championship, this time finishing 97 points behind Ben Adriaenssen and Ben van den Bogaart. Stupelis and Bax finished second in the World Championship for a third consecutive time in 2014, 18 points behind Adriaenssen and van den Bogaart.

Stupelis and Bax won the 2015 World Championship in the second-last event of the season. After the end of the season, it was announced that Stupelis would not race with Bax in 2016 as the latter would switch to his younger brother Robbie Bax as his passenger.

As Willemsens passenger, Stupelis has also won two Dutch national titles, in 2003 and 2004. In 2012, 2014 and 2015, now with Etienne Bax, he won three more national titles in the Netherlands.

=== Season by season ===
Season	Driver	Equipment	Position	Points	Races	Wins	Second	Third
2001	(Latvia) Modris Štelle	Zabel-AYR	27	14	10	—	—	—
2002	(Latvia) Modris Štelle	Zabel-AYR	23	69	12	—	—	—
2003	(Netherlands) Daniël Willemsen	Zabel-VMC	1	561	24	13	9	—
2004	(Netherlands) Daniël Willemsen	Zabel-VMC	1	572	26	18	4	1
2005	(Latvia) Kristers Serģis	MTH-BSU	2	440	22	7	12	—
2006	(Latvia) Kristers Serģis	KTM-Mefo	19	64	4	—	2	1
2007	(Latvia) Kristers Serģis	KTM-Mefo	3	242	16	1	8	1
2008	(Latvia) Kristers Serģis	KTM-AYR	2	434	24	4	12	2
2009	(Belgium) Nicky Pulinx	Zabel-VMC	12	229	25	—	—	—
2010	(Latvia) Māris Rupeiks	KTM-WSP	5	423	28	1	4	2
2011	(Latvia) Māris Rupeiks	Zabel-WSP	4	316	22	1	4	—
2012	(Netherlands) Etienne Bax	Zabel-WSP	2	447	22	9	8	1
2013	(Netherlands) Etienne Bax	Zabel-VMC	2	513	25	14	6	—
2014	(Netherlands) Etienne Bax	Zabel-WSP	2	402	19	8	5	3
2015	(Netherlands) Etienne Bax	Zabel-WSP	1	675	30	16	7	3
	Overall 2001 – 2015			5,301	299	92	81	14

Source:"The John Davey Pages – Kaspars Stupelis". John Davey.

- Passengers in italics.

== Honours ==
=== World Championship ===
- Champions: (4) 2003, 2004, 2015, 2019
- Runners-up: (5) 2005, 2008, 2012, 2013, 2014

=== Netherlands ===
- Champions: (5) 2003, 2004, 2012, 2014, 2015, 2018

Sporting positions
Preceded by Ben van den Bogaart	Sidecarcross World Champion (passenger); 2015	Incumbent
Preceded by Artis Rasmanis	Sidecarcross World Champion (passenger); 2003–2004	Succeeded by Sven Verbrugge
Preceded by Dagwin Sabbe	Dutch national sidecarcross champion (passenger); 2003–2004	Succeeded by Christian Verhagen
Preceded by Ben van den Bogaart	Dutch national sidecarcross champion (passenger); 2012	Succeeded by Christian Verhagen
Preceded by Ben van den Bogaart	Dutch national sidecarcross champion (passenger); 2014–present	Incumbent
