= 2001 Sidecarcross World Championship =

Season
- Grands Prix: 14
- Duration: 1 April 2001–30 September 2001

Drivers
- Champions: (Latvia) Kristers Serģis (Latvia) Artis Rasmanis

The 2001 FIM Sidecarcross World Championship, the 22nd edition of the competition, started on 1 April and finished after fourteen Grand Prix on 30 September 2001.

The defending champions were Kristers Serģis and his passenger Artis Rasmanis from Latvia who also took out the 2001 championship, thereby winning their fourth World Championship together, becoming the third team in the history of the sport to do so. For one race of the season, the first of the two German Grand Prix, Serģis rode with Dutch passenger Christian Verhagen by his side, in all other events he participated with Rasmanis. The pair won the competition with a margin of 123 points, with Dutch rider Daniël Willemsen and his Belgian passenger Sven Verbrugge coming second, as they had done the year before. Willemsen, like Serģis, used a different passenger for one event, Czech rider Premsyl Novotny in the first of the two German Grand Prix. Third place went to the Swedish combination of Henrik Söderqvist and Tobias Sylwan, who had previously achieved the same result in 1999. All up, 51 teams were classified in the overall standings with last place going to the Estonian team of Tommas and Tinnu Soir.

The Sidecarcross World Championship, first held in 1980 and organised by the Fédération Internationale de Motocyclisme, is an annual competition. All races, manufacturers and the vast majority of riders in the competition being in and from Europe. Sidecarcross is similar to motocross except that the teams consist of two riders, a driver and a passenger. Races are held on the same tracks as solo motocross but the handling of the machines differs as sidecars don't lean. The majority of physical work in the sport is carried out by the passenger, who speeds up the sidecarcross in corners by leaning out. The coordination between the driver and the passenger are therefore of highest importance.

== Overview ==
The fourteen races of the season were held in eleven countries, Germany (2x), France, Latvia (2x), Estonia (2x), Ukraine, Belgium, Czech Republic, Sweden, Great Britain, Switzerland and the Netherlands. In comparison to the 2000 edition which had thirteen Grand Prix, the Grand Prix of the Czech Republic and Ukraine had been added to the calendar while the GP of Belarus had been dropped.

Events typically consist of a qualifying competition, held in multiple stages on Saturdays of a race weekend while the two race events are typically held on Sundays. One exception to this rule is Easter weekends, when the races are held on Easter Monday. Race weekends can consist of additional motocross or quart support races as well, but the FIM stipulates that the World Championship races have priority. Riders have to be provided with at least one 30 minute free practice session, which will be timed. A race can consist of up to 30 starters and the qualifying modus is dependent on the number of entries. Up to 32 entries, it will be held in one group split into two sessions of 30 minutes each. Above 32 entries, the starter field will be sub-divided into two groups through ballot and the current standings. Each qualifying group can consist of up to 30 racers. Should there be more than 60 entries, a pre-qualifying has to be held. Of the riders in the two groups, the top-twelve directly qualify for the races. The remaining teams then go to a second-chance qualifying, in which the best six advance. The riders placed seventh and eighth remain in reserve should one of the qualified teams not be able to participate.

The points system used in 2001 was uniquely different from the seasons before or after. In comparison to the system used until 2000, sixteen instead of fifteen teams were awarded points per race while the points for the race winner were increased from 20 to 25:

Place	Points
1	25
2	20
3	16
4	13
5	11
6	10
7	9
8	8

Place	Points
9	7
10	6
11	5
12	4
13	3
14	2
15	1
16	-

== Retirements ==
At the end of the 2001 season a number of long-term competitors retired from the World Championship, the most successful of those being British rider Chris Etheridge, active since 1986 and with a seventh place in 1993 as his best result, and Dutch Jacky Janssen, active since 1991 and with four fourth places from 1994 to 1996 and, again, in 2001 as his best results.

== Calendar ==
The calendar for the 2001 season:

Date	Place	Race winners	GP winner	Source
1 April	(France) Castelnau-de-Lévis	(Latvia) Kristers Sergis / Artis Rasmanis	(Latvia) Kristers Sergis / Artis Rasmanis	Result
1 April	(France) Castelnau-de-Lévis	(Latvia) Kristers Sergis / Artis Rasmanis	(Latvia) Kristers Sergis / Artis Rasmanis	Result
6 May	(Germany) Pflückuff	(Netherlands) Daniël Willemsen / Premsyl Novotny	(Netherlands) Daniël Willemsen / Premsyl Novotny	Result
6 May	(Germany) Pflückuff	(Netherlands) Daniël Willemsen / Premsyl Novotny	(Netherlands) Daniël Willemsen / Premsyl Novotny	Result
3 June	(Germany) Bielstein	(Latvia) Kristers Sergis / Artis Rasmanis	(Latvia) Kristers Sergis / Artis Rasmanis	Result
3 June	(Germany) Bielstein	(Latvia) Kristers Sergis / Artis Rasmanis	(Latvia) Kristers Sergis / Artis Rasmanis	Result
10 June	(Latvia) Cēsis	(Latvia) Kristers Sergis / Artis Rasmanis	(Sweden) Henrik Söderqvist / Tobias Sylwan	Result
10 June	(Latvia) Cēsis	(Sweden) Henrik Söderqvist / Tobias Sylwan	(Sweden) Henrik Söderqvist / Tobias Sylwan	Result
9 June	(Estonia) Saku	(Latvia) Kristers Sergis / Artis Rasmanis	(Latvia) Kristers Sergis / Artis Rasmanis	Result
9 June	(Estonia) Saku	(Latvia) Kristers Sergis / Artis Rasmanis	(Latvia) Kristers Sergis / Artis Rasmanis	Result
1 July	(Ukraine) Chernivtsi	(Latvia) Kristers Sergis / Artis Rasmanis	(Latvia) Kristers Sergis / Artis Rasmanis	Result
1 July	(Ukraine) Chernivtsi	(Latvia) Kristers Sergis / Artis Rasmanis	(Latvia) Kristers Sergis / Artis Rasmanis	Result
15 July	(Belgium) Neeroeteren	(Latvia) Kristers Sergis / Artis Rasmanis	(Germany) Klaus Weinmann / Thomas Weinmann	Result
15 July	(Belgium) Neeroeteren	(Germany) Klaus Weinmann / Thomas Weinmann	(Germany) Klaus Weinmann / Thomas Weinmann	Result
22 July	(Czech Republic) Loket	(Latvia) Kristers Sergis / Artis Rasmanis	(Latvia) Kristers Sergis / Artis Rasmanis	Result
22 July	(Czech Republic) Loket	(Latvia) Kristers Sergis / Artis Rasmanis	(Latvia) Kristers Sergis / Artis Rasmanis	Result
5 August	(Estonia) Jaanikese	(Latvia) Kristers Sergis / Artis Rasmanis	(Latvia) Kristers Sergis / Artis Rasmanis	Result
5 August	(Estonia) Jaanikese	(Netherlands) Daniël Willemsen / Sven Verbrugge	(Latvia) Kristers Sergis / Artis Rasmanis	Result
12 August	(Latvia) Ķegums	(Netherlands) Daniël Willemsen / Sven Verbrugge	(Latvia) Kristers Sergis / Artis Rasmanis	Result
12 August	(Latvia) Ķegums	(Latvia) Kristers Sergis / Artis Rasmanis	(Latvia) Kristers Sergis / Artis Rasmanis	Result
26 August	(Sweden) Saxtorp	(Netherlands) Daniël Willemsen / Sven Verbrugge	(Netherlands) Daniël Willemsen / Sven Verbrugge	Result
26 August	(Sweden) Saxtorp	(Netherlands) Daniël Willemsen / Sven Verbrugge	(Netherlands) Daniël Willemsen / Sven Verbrugge	Result
2 September	(United Kingdom) Canada Heights	(Netherlands) Daniël Willemsen / Sven Verbrugge	(Netherlands) Daniël Willemsen / Sven Verbrugge	Result
2 September	(United Kingdom) Canada Heights	(Netherlands) Daniël Willemsen / Sven Verbrugge	(Netherlands) Daniël Willemsen / Sven Verbrugge	Result
9 September	(Switzerland) Tägerig	(Netherlands) Daniël Willemsen / Sven Verbrugge	(Netherlands) Daniël Willemsen / Sven Verbrugge	Result
9 September	(Switzerland) Tägerig	(Latvia) Kristers Sergis / Artis Rasmanis	(Netherlands) Daniël Willemsen / Sven Verbrugge	Result
30 September	(Netherlands) Oss	(Netherlands) Daniël Willemsen / Sven Verbrugge	(Latvia) Kristers Sergis / Artis Rasmanis	Result
30 September	(Netherlands) Oss	(Latvia) Kristers Sergis / Artis Rasmanis	(Latvia) Kristers Sergis / Artis Rasmanis	Result

- Flags for passengers not shown.

== Classification ==
=== Riders ===
The top ten teams in the final overall standings were:

Position	Driver / Passenger	Equipment	Bike No	Points
1	(Latvia) Kristers Serģis / Artis Rasmanis	MTH-BSU		550
2	(Netherlands) Daniel Willemsen / (Belgium) Sven Verbrugge	Zabel-BSU		427
3	(Sweden) Henrik Söderqvist / Tobias Sylwan	MTH-EML		351
4	(Netherlands) Jacky Janssen / Wiljam Janssen	MTH-BSU		304
5	(Estonia) Are Kaurit / Arvo Laksberg	MTH-AYR		265
6	(Estonia) Alvar Korjus / Jurgen Jakk	MTH-AYR		262
7	(Germany) Klaus Weinmann / Thomas Weinmann	MTH-EML		205
8	(Belgium) Peter Steegmans / Dagwin Sabbe	MTH-EML		170
9	(Germany) Marko Happich / Sebastian Boehme	Zabel-VMC		170
10	(France) Benoit Beaumont / (Netherlands) Henry van de Wiel	MTH-BSU		164

- Equipment listed is motor and frame.
