= 2008 Sidecarcross World Championship =

Season
- Grands Prix: 12
- Duration: 20 April–28 September

Drivers
- Champions: (Netherlands) Daniël Willemsen (Switzerland) Reto Grütter
- Sidecarcross des Nations: Netherlands

The 2008 FIM Sidecarcross world championship, the 29th edition of the competition, started on 20 April and finished after twelve race weekends on 14 September 2008. Daniël Willemsen and Reto Grütter were the defending champions, having won the title in 2007, and repeated this achievement in 2008.

== Overview ==
The 2008 season was the 29th edition of the sidecarcross world championship.

The twelve races of the season were held in ten countries, the Netherlands, Czech Republic, France (2x), Germany (2x), Croatia, Belgium, Latvia, Estonia, Ukraine and Denmark.

After 17 seasons in the Sidecarcross World Championship, five-time World Champion Kristers Sergis announced his retirement from the competition, finishing his career with a second place in the 2008 edition.

== Format ==
Every Grand Prix weekend is split into two races, both held on the same day. This means, the 2008 season with its twelve Grand Prix has 24 races. Each race lasts for 30 minutes plus two rounds. The two races on a weekend actually get combined to determine an overall winner. While this overall winners receives no extra WC points, they usually are awarded a special trophy.

The first twenty teams of each race score competition points. The point system for the 2008 season is as follows:

Place	Points
1	25
2	22
3	20
4	18
5	16
6	15
7	14
8	13
9	12
10	11

Place	Points
11	10
12	9
13	8
14	7
15	6
16	5
17	4
18	3
19	2
20	1

== Calendar ==
The calendar for the 2008 season:

Date	Place	Race winners	GP winner
20 April	(Netherlands) Oss	(Latvia) Kristers Sergis / Kaspars Stupelis	(Belgium) Jan Hendrickx / Tim Smeuninx
20 April	(Netherlands) Oss	(Belgium) Jan Hendrickx / Tim Smeuninx	(Belgium) Jan Hendrickx / Tim Smeuninx
11 May	(Czech Republic) Jinín	(Netherlands) Daniël Willemsen / (Switzerland) Reto Grütter	(Netherlands) Daniël Willemsen / (Switzerland) Reto Grütter
11 May	(Czech Republic) Jinín	(Netherlands) Daniël Willemsen / (Switzerland) Reto Grütter	(Netherlands) Daniël Willemsen / (Switzerland) Reto Grütter
18 May	(Ukraine) Chernivtsi	(Latvia) Kristers Sergis / Kaspars Stupelis	(Latvia) Kristers Sergis / Kaspars Stupelis
18 May	(Ukraine) Chernivtsi	(Netherlands) Daniël Willemsen / (Switzerland) Reto Grütter	(Latvia) Kristers Sergis / Kaspars Stupelis
1 June	(Italy) Cingoli	(Netherlands) Daniël Willemsen / (Switzerland) Reto Grütter	(Netherlands) Daniël Willemsen / (Switzerland) Reto Grütter
1 June	(Italy) Cingoli	(Netherlands) Daniël Willemsen / (Switzerland) Reto Grütter	(Netherlands) Daniël Willemsen / (Switzerland) Reto Grütter
8 June	(France) Bourg-Bruche	(Netherlands) Daniël Willemsen / (Switzerland) Reto Grütter	(Netherlands) Daniël Willemsen / (Switzerland) Reto Grütter
8 June	(France) Bourg-Bruche	(Netherlands) Daniël Willemsen / (Switzerland) Reto Grütter	(Netherlands) Daniël Willemsen / (Switzerland) Reto Grütter
13 July	(Belgium) Genk	(Netherlands) Daniël Willemsen / (Switzerland) Reto Grütter	(Netherlands) Daniël Willemsen / (Switzerland) Reto Grütter
13 July	(Belgium) Genk	(Netherlands) Daniël Willemsen / (Switzerland) Reto Grütter	(Netherlands) Daniël Willemsen / (Switzerland) Reto Grütter
20 July	(Germany) Strassbessenbach	(Netherlands) Daniël Willemsen / (Switzerland) Reto Grütter	(Latvia) Kristers Sergis / Kaspars Stupelis
20 July	(Germany) Strassbessenbach	(Latvia) Kristers Sergis / Kaspars Stupelis	(Latvia) Kristers Sergis / Kaspars Stupelis
3 August	(Denmark) Slagelse	(Netherlands) Daniël Willemsen / (Switzerland) Reto Grütter	(Netherlands) Daniël Willemsen / (Switzerland) Reto Grütter
3 August	(Denmark) Slagelse	(Netherlands) Daniël Willemsen / (Switzerland) Reto Grütter	(Netherlands) Daniël Willemsen / (Switzerland) Reto Grütter
10 August	(Latvia) Kegums	(Netherlands) Daniël Willemsen / (Switzerland) Reto Grütter	(Latvia) Maris Rupeiks / Haralds Kurpnieks
10 August	(Latvia) Kegums	(Latvia) Kristers Sergis / Kaspars Stupelis	(Latvia) Maris Rupeiks / Haralds Kurpnieks
17 August	(Estonia) Kiviõli	(Netherlands) Daniël Willemsen / (Switzerland) Reto Grütter	(Netherlands) Daniël Willemsen / (Switzerland) Reto Grütter
17 August	(Estonia) Kiviõli	(Netherlands) Daniël Willemsen / (Switzerland) Reto Grütter	(Netherlands) Daniël Willemsen / (Switzerland) Reto Grütter
7 September	(France) Dardon Guegnon	(Netherlands) Daniël Willemsen / (Switzerland) Reto Grütter	(Netherlands) Daniël Willemsen / (Switzerland) Reto Grütter
7 September	(France) Dardon Guegnon	(Netherlands) Daniël Willemsen / (Switzerland) Reto Grütter	(Netherlands) Daniël Willemsen / (Switzerland) Reto Grütter
14 September	(Germany) Rudersberg	(Netherlands) Daniël Willemsen / (Switzerland) Reto Grütter	(Netherlands) Daniël Willemsen / (Switzerland) Reto Grütter
14 September	(Germany) Rudersberg	(Netherlands) Daniël Willemsen / (Switzerland) Reto Grütter	(Netherlands) Daniël Willemsen / (Switzerland) Reto Grütter
28 September	(Belgium) Genk	Netherlands	

- The Sidecarcross des Nations in Genk on 28 September 2008 is a non-championship event but part of the calendar and is denoted by a light blue background in the table above.
- Only Kegums and Rudersberg have been part of the 2007 race season, all other ten courses are new compare to last season.

== Classification ==
=== Riders ===
The top ten of the 2008 season were:

Position	Driver / Passenger	Equipment	Bike No	Points
1	(Netherlands) Daniël Willemsen / (Switzerland) Reto Grütter	Zabel-VMC	1	531
2	(Latvia) Kristers Sergis / Kaspars Stupelis	KTM-AYR	3	434
3	(Belgium) Jan Hendrickx / Tim Smeuninx	Zabel-VMC	2	421
4	(Belgium) Joris Hendrickx / (Latvia) Kaspars Liepins	KTM-AYR	8	394
5	(Germany) Marko Happich / (Switzerland) Meinrad Schelbert	Zabel-MEFO	7	317
6	(Latvia) Maris Rupeiks / Haralds Kurpnieks	KTM-AYR	6	297
7	(Czech Republic) Vaclav Rozehnal / Marek Rozehnal	Zabel-VMC	5	273
8	(Latvia) Janis Daiders / Lauris Daiders	KTM-AYR	10	269
9	(Belgium) Nicky Pulinx / (Czech Republic) Ondrej Cermak	Zabel-VMC	14	244
10	(Netherlands) Etienne Bax / Marc van Deutekom	Zabel-VMC	21	240

- Equipment listed is motor and frame.

=== Manufacturers ===
Parallel to the riders championship, a manufacturers competition is also held. The final standings in the manufacturers competition were:

Position	Manufacturer	Points
1	VMC	584
2	AYR	504
3	KTM	394
4	Husaberg	0
4	BSU	0

== Race by race statistics ==
The numbers for every team are allocated according to their 2007 season finish, meaning the world champion received number one and so on. The numbers for drivers not participating this season were not re-allocated. New entries received a random number above the number 48 which is the last place achieved by a driver in the points in 2007. This system makes it possible to see a driver's improvement or decline from last year by comparing number with position.

The following teams have taken part in races this season:

	Driver / Passenger	Equipment	No.	Points	1	2	3	4	5	6	7	8	9	10	11	12	13	14	15	16	17	18	19	20	21	22	23	24
1	(Netherlands) Daniël Willemsen / (Switzerland) Reto Grütter *	Zabel-VMC	1	531	5	3	1	1	3	1	1	1	1	1	1	1	1	x	1	1	1	D^{1}	1	1	1	1	1	1
2	(Latvia) Kristers Serģis / Kaspars Stupelis	KTM-AYR	3	434	1	x	2	x	1	2	2	3	2	5	x	2	3	1	2	2	7	1	2	D^{2}	2	2	2	2
3	(Belgium) Jan Hendrickx / Tim Smeuninx	Zabel-VMC	2	421	2	1	7	4	8	6	13	6	5	2	2	3	8	5	4	4	5	2	3	3	7	3	4	5
4	(Belgium) Joris Hendrickx / (Latvia) Kaspars Liepiņš	KTM-AYR	8	394	3	7	3	5	2	7	5	4	8	4	3	4	12	2	6	8	6	5	5	10	5	4	5	4
5	(Germany) Marko Happich / (Switzerland) Meinrad Schelbert	Zabel-MEFO	7	317	x	4	6	6	7	4	3	2	4	3	x	11	6	11	18	x	8	3	8	9	9	5	8	3
6	(Latvia) Māris Rupeiks / Haralds Kurpnieks	KTM-AYR	6	297	12	x	4	8	12	5	7	x	12	7	4	7	5	6	x	7	2	4	11	2	3	x	7	9
7	(Czech Republic) Vaclav Rozehnal / Marek Rozehnal	Zabel-VMC	5	273	14	8	x	2	4	3	4	11	7	6	7	8	2	x	13	12	10	7	15	6	8	10	x	x
8	(Latvia) Jānis Daiders / Lauris Daiders	KTM-AYR	10	269	19	12	11	x	6	11	6	x	x	9	6	x	4	10	9	6	3	13	6	4	6	7	3	6
9	(Belgium) Nicky Pulinx / (Czech Republic) Ondrej Cermak *	Zabel-VMC	14	244	16	x	9	16	5	9	9	7	9	14	x	6	11	9	14	19	4	12	4	5	4	6	12	x
10	(Netherlands) Etienne Bax / Marc van Deutekom	Zabel-VMC	21	240	4	x	8	10	x	12	8	8	6	10	8	15	10	3	8	13	9	9	7	x	14	13	13	16
11	(Netherlands) Marcel Willemsen / (Germany) Marco Godau	Zabel-VSP	17	208	10	11	5	7	9	8	12	x	x	18	9	10	15	8	5	5	15	10	x	14	13	x	15	13
12	(Netherlands) Carlo van Duijnhoven / Christian Verhagen	Zabel-VMC	12	172	8	6	15	11	17	13	14	12	15	x	x	18	x	15	x	10	11	6	10	7	x	11	16	12
13	(Netherlands) Thijs Derks / Gertie Eggink *	Husaberg-VMC	27	158	13	2	14	18	x	15	17	x	10	8	10	9	x	18	10	20	17	8	16	13	17	12	18	x
14	(Netherlands) Eric Schrijver / Henry van de Wiel	MTH-VMC	101	139	6	5	19	x	14	14	19	14	11	12	12	16	9	14			13	19	18	x	11	x	14	x
15	(Germany) Martin Walter / Andre Saam *	Zabel-WSP	15	127	x	20	10	9	11	10	10	5	x	x	11	x	14	14	x	16	18	x	x	11			x	13
16	(Belgium) Peter Steegmans / Dagwin Sabbe	Zabel-WSP	40	115	20	17					x	9			5	5	7	4	x	x	12	x	9	8				
17	(United Kingdom) Stuart Brown / Luke Peters *	Zabel-VMC	24	108	18	9					11	x	3	13	13	17	20	x							x	8	6	7
18	(Germany) Thomas Morch / Marius Strauss	Zabel-WSP	23	102			12	13	10	18	18	10	17	19	16	19	x	15	x	14	19	16	17	18	16	x	10	19
19	(Belgium) Kristof Santermans / (Netherlands) Ben van den Bogaart	Zabel-WSP	33	93	x	16	x	x			15	19	x	17	15	12	17	x	x	11	16	11	x	12	10	9	x	x
20	(Sweden) Henrik Söderqvist / Tobias Sylwan	Husaberg-AYR	11	89			x	3											3	3					15		9	10
21	(Czech Republic) Lukas Cerny / Tomas Huml	JAWA-VMC	31	74			13	12	16	17			18	x	x	13	x	20	11	17			14	x	19	14	19	17
22	(Netherlands) Jarno van den Boomen / Bjorn Roes *	Zabel-VMC	16	68	11	x	17	15	13	x					x	14			7	9	14	x	x	x				
23	(Estonia) Margo Sonn / Maarek Mill	KTM-AYR	103	65			16	14	15	16	20	20	19	15	14	x	x	x	16	18	x	18	13	15			x	
24	(United Kingdom) John Lyne / Pete Girling	Zabel-VMC	26	55	17	15					x	13	16	x	x	20			12	x	x	x	x	x	x	19	11	11
25	(France) Baptiste Bigand / Julien Bigand	Zabel-VMC	35	45	x	x					16	15	13	x	x	x	x	19	x	x	x		12	x	12	15	x	x
26	(Switzerland) Andy Bürgler / (Sweden) Daniel Fagerberg	KTM-VMC	4	31	9	10											13	x										
27	(Belgium) Andreas Clohse / (Netherlands) Robbie Bax	JAWA-VMC	28	27							x	16	14	x			x	x			20	14	x	x	18	17	x	x
28	(Germany) Josef Brustmann / Stefan Urich	KTM-NPM	29	25													16	7									x	15
29	(Sweden) Patrick Fagerberg / Daniel Fagerberg	KTM-AYR	122	24			18	17							x	x			20	15	x	15	x	17				
30	(Netherlands) Jan Visscher / Jeroen Visscher	Zabel-VMC	38	21	7	x																			20	16		20
31	(Switzerland) Josua Luscher / Markus Gloor	Husaberg-VMC	87	21							x	17	20	11			19	17										
32	(Austria) Bertram Martin / (Switzerland) Bruno Kaelin	Zabel-VMC	68	21							x	x	x	16			x	12									x	14
33	(United Kingdom) Scott Wilkinson / Gary Burt	Zabel-VMC	19	18	x	14							x	x	17	x	x	x									17	18
34	(Estonia) Gert Godejev / Keit Kivaste	KTM-AYR	151	16			20	19	18	x											x	17	20	16				
35	(United Kingdom) Daniel Millard / Joe Millard	Husaberg-WSP	99	13							x	18	x	x	18	x			15	x					x	20		
36	(Netherlands) Wim Janssen / Bart Notten	Zabel-VMC	55	9	15	18																						
37	(Czech Republic) Tomas Cermak / Ondrej Cermak	JAWA-MEFO	9	8	x	13																						
38	(Germany) Jens Bochmann / Sandro Michelotto	KTM-VMC	69	5			x	x	19	x							18	x										
39	(Estonia) Urmas Sugasep / Veiko Parksepp	KTM-AYR	911	5											20	x			19	x			19	x				
40	(Netherlands) Patrick Greup / Roy Derks *	MTH-VMC	111	4	x	x													17	x								
41	(France) Benjamin Daniel / Guennady Auveray	Husaberg-VMC	116	4																					x	18	20	x
42	(Russia) Dmitry Anochin / Maxim Scherbak	Zabel-MEFO	142	3					20	19																		
43	(Latvia) Oskars Liepiņš / Ilvars Ameļkins	KTM-AYR	45	2																	x	x	x	19				
44	(Belgium) Sonny Van Niewenhuse / Birger Beernaert	Husaberg-VMC	132	2											19	x												
45	(Estonia) Kert Varik / Erkki Koiv	KTM-AYR	39	2	x	19											x	x			x							
46	(Estonia) Sverre Lamp / Alar Lamp	KTM-AYR	50	1																	x	x	x	20				
47	(Estonia) Argo Poldsaar / Indrek Aljes	KTM-AYR	48	1																	x	20						
48	(Netherlands) Gert van Werven / Rick Sellis	KTM-VMC	89	1									x	20													x	x
49	(Lithuania) Liutauras Variakois / (Latvia) Artūrs Linters	KTM-AYR	57	1					x	20											x	x						
50	(Austria) Anton Wanger / (Czech Republic) Michael Gabor	MTH-MEFO	52	1			x	20																				
	(Belgium) Geert Devoldere / (France) Edouard Chereau	Husaberg-MEFO	25	0	x	x			x	x	x	x																
	(Netherlands) Johan Smit / Peter Holleman	Zabel-BSU	115	0	x	x	x	x																				
	(Lithuania) Romas Kišūnas / Mantas Kišūnas	Zabel-BSU	60	0			x	x																				
	(Germany) Willi Lieble / (Czech Republic) Vaclav Hotovy	MEFO	65	0			x	x																				
	(Sweden) Sonnie Folkesson / Mattias Andersson	MTH-MEFO	172	0			x	x																				
	(Czech Republic) Jaroslav Kriz / Milan Gazik	MTH-EML	112	0			x	x																				
	(France) Andre Michel Bernard / Jacques Pillier	VMC	82	0					x	x									x	x		x			x	x		
	(Ukraine) Vadim Briuhov / Vitaly Babic	Zabel	84	0					x	x																		
	(Ukraine) Vasyl Kolisnichenko / Dmitro Sorokin	BSU	83	0					x	x																		
	(Estonia) Sergei Ivanov / Atho Jalas	AYR	53	0					x	x																		
	(Ukraine) Oleh Kuklin / Vasyl Nesterenko	MEFO	85	0					x	x																		
	(Ukraine) Dmytro Grychanuk / Oleksandr Litovchenko	BSU	86	0					x																			
	(Ukraine) Valeriy Starchenko / Evhen Potanin	VMC	81	0						x																		
	(United Kingdom) Mark Kinge / Gary Kinge	KTM-VMC	71	0							x	x							x	x					x	x		
	(Germany) Marko Schulz / (Austria) Mario Meusburger	Zabel-VMC	72	0							x	x																
	(Austria) Kevin Bitsche / Johannes Vonbun	Zabel-WSP	67	0							x	x	x	x														
	(France) Jean-Marie Ains / Bernard Jayet	MEFO	37	0									x	x											x	x		
	(United Kingdom) Andy Eastman / Steve Krwin	KTM-VMC	36	0											x	x												
	(Sweden) Robin Karlsson / Richard Karlsson	AYR	118	0															x	x								
	(Estonia) Madis Olt / Tõnu Valdma	AYR	70	0																		x						
	(Finland) Marko Dammert / Mika Hietala	AYR	96	0																			x	x				
	(France) Florian Blanco / Vincent Blanco	Husaberg	117	0																					x	x		
	(France) Herve Boursaud / Emeric Poirier	VMC	78	0																					x			
	(France) Patrik Gorardin / Dominique Desplaces	VMC	113	0																						x		
	(Germany) Jürgen Blank / Rainer Semet	VMC	80	0																							x	x

- Where there is only one flag shown, it indicates driver and passenger are from the same country.
- Placings below the first twenty not shown.
- Teams who took part in the qualifying but failed to qualify for a race are not shown.
- x denotes qualified for race but finished outside of points.
- Passengers in italics.
- Equipment is engine and frame.
- Daniël Willemsen used Bruno Kaelin as his passenger in the first two races.
- Jarno van den Boomen used Guennady Auvrey as his passenger in race one and two, Premysl Novotny in race three and four and Sven Verbrugge in race five and six.
- Thijs Derks used Tom van Duijnhoven as his passenger in race one and two.
- Nicky Pulinx used Sven Verbrugge as his passenger in race one to four.
- Stuart Brown used Wilfreid Keuben as his passenger in race one and two and Colin Dunkley in race seven to ten.
- Patrick Greup used Jimmy van Gennip as his passenger in race one and two.
- Martin Walter used Thomas Weinmann as his passenger in race 23 and 24.
- Only 30 teams registered in time for the Jinin race, therefore every team qualified for the race.
- ^{1} In race fourteen of the season, the team Willemsen/Grütter was disqualified due to Grütter losing a glove, after a protest by Kristers Sergis. The lost glove disabled the emergency-stop system of the bike, which is a break of FIM rules.
- ^{2} In race twenty of the season, the team Sergis/Stupelis was disqualified after winning the race due to the team mechanic refusing an inspection of the bike. The bike supposedly did not comply with noise level regulations.
