= 2002 Sidecarcross World Championship =

Season
- Grands Prix: 14
- Duration: 1 April 2002–22 September 2002

Drivers
- Champions: (Latvia) Kristers Serģis (Latvia) Artis Rasmanis
- Sidecarcross des Nations: Netherlands

The 2002 FIM Sidecarcross World Championship, the 23rd edition of the competition, started on 1 April and finished after fourteen race weekends on 22 September 2002.

The defending champions were Kristers Serģis and his passenger Artis Rasmanis from Latvia who also took out the 2002 championship. The team set a record for number of points scored, 662, and for world championships won, becoming the first-ever team to win five sidecarcross world championships. While Rasmanis permanently retired from the sport after the 2002 season Kristers Serģis continued his career in the sport until 2008, however without being able to win another world title.

The Sidecarcross World Championship, first held in 1980 and organised by the Fédération Internationale de Motocyclisme, is an annual competition. All races, manufacturers and the vast majority of riders in the competition being in and from Europe. Sidecarcross is similar to motocross except that the teams consist of two riders, a driver and a passenger. Races are held on the same tracks as solo motocross but the handling of the machines differs as sidecars don't lean. The majority of physical work in the sport is carried out by the passenger, who speeds up the sidecarcross in corners by leaning out. The coordination between the driver and the passenger are therefore of highest importance.

== Overview ==
The fourteen races of the season were held in nine countries: Netherlands (2x), Bulgaria, Czech Republic, Estonia (2x), Latvia (2x), Germany (2x), France (2x), Sweden and Belgium. In comparison to the 2001 edition, the Grand Prix of Switzerland, Ukraine and Great Britain have been dropped off the calendar while the Bulgarian GP made a return.

Events typically consist of a qualifying competition, held in multiple stages on Saturdays of a race weekend while the two race events are typically held on Sundays. One exception to this rule is Easter weekends, when the races are held on Easter Monday. Race weekends can consist of additional motocross or quart support races as well, but the FIM stipulates that the World Championship races have priority. Riders have to be provided with at least one 30-minute free practice season, which will be timed. A race can consist of up to 30 starters and the qualifying modus is dependent on the number of entries. With up to 32 entries, it will be held in one group split into two sessions of 30 minutes each. Above 32 entries, the starter field will be sub-divided into two groups through ballot and the current standings. Each qualifying group can consist of up to 30 racers. Should there be more than 60 entries, a pre-qualifying has to be held. Of the riders in the two groups, the top twelve directly qualify for the races. The remaining teams then go to a second-chance qualifying, in which the best six advance. The riders placed seventh and eighth remain in reserve should one of the qualified teams not be able to participate.

The first twenty teams of each race score competition points. It was the first season this points system was used. In the 2001 season, only the sixteen best teams were awarded points. The point system for the season was as follows:

Place	Points
1	25
2	22
3	20
4	18
5	16
6	15
7	14
8	13
9	12
10	11

Place	Points
11	10
12	9
13	8
14	7
15	6
16	5
17	4
18	3
19	2
20	1

== Retirements ==
At the end of the 2002 season a number of long-term competitors retired from the World Championship, the most successful of those being German Klaus Weinmann, runners-up 1995 and active since 1984.

== Calendar ==
The calendar for the 2002 season:

Date	Place	Race winners	GP winner	Source
1 April	(Netherlands) Oldebroek	(Latvia) Kristers Sergis / Artis Rasmanis	(Netherlands) Daniël Willemsen / Alfons Eggers	Result
1 April	(Netherlands) Oldebroek	(Netherlands) Daniël Willemsen / Alfons Eggers	(Netherlands) Daniël Willemsen / Alfons Eggers	Result
12 May	(Bulgaria) Sevlievo	(Latvia) Kristers Sergis / Artis Rasmanis	(Latvia) Kristers Sergis / Artis Rasmanis	Result
12 May	(Bulgaria) Sevlievo	(Latvia) Kristers Sergis / Artis Rasmanis	(Latvia) Kristers Sergis / Artis Rasmanis	Result
19 May	(Czech Republic) Jinín	(Latvia) Kristers Sergis / Artis Rasmanis	(Latvia) Kristers Sergis / Artis Rasmanis	Result
19 May	(Czech Republic) Jinín	(Latvia) Kristers Sergis / Artis Rasmanis	(Latvia) Kristers Sergis / Artis Rasmanis	Result
1 June	(Estonia) Jaanikese	(Latvia) Kristers Sergis / Artis Rasmanis	(Latvia) Kristers Sergis / Artis Rasmanis	Result
1 June	(Estonia) Jaanikese	(Latvia) Kristers Sergis / Artis Rasmanis	(Latvia) Kristers Sergis / Artis Rasmanis	Result
9 June	(Latvia) Cēsis	(Latvia) Kristers Sergis / Artis Rasmanis	(Latvia) Kristers Sergis / Artis Rasmanis	Result
9 June	(Latvia) Cēsis	(Latvia) Kristers Sergis / Artis Rasmanis	(Latvia) Kristers Sergis / Artis Rasmanis	Result
23 June	(Netherlands) Oss	(Latvia) Kristers Sergis / Artis Rasmanis	(Latvia) Kristers Sergis / Artis Rasmanis	Result
23 June	(Netherlands) Oss	(Latvia) Kristers Sergis / Artis Rasmanis	(Latvia) Kristers Sergis / Artis Rasmanis	Result
14 July	(Germany) Strassbessenbach	(Latvia) Kristers Sergis / Artis Rasmanis	(Latvia) Kristers Sergis / Artis Rasmanis	Result
14 July	(Germany) Strassbessenbach	(Latvia) Kristers Sergis / Artis Rasmanis	(Latvia) Kristers Sergis / Artis Rasmanis	Result
21 July	(France) Lacapelle-Marival	(Latvia) Kristers Sergis / Artis Rasmanis	(Latvia) Kristers Sergis / Artis Rasmanis	Result
21 July	(France) Lacapelle-Marival	(France) Benoit Beaumont / Henry van de Wiel	(Latvia) Kristers Sergis / Artis Rasmanis	Result
11 August	(Latvia) Ķegums	(Latvia) Kristers Sergis / Artis Rasmanis	(Latvia) Kristers Sergis / Artis Rasmanis	Result
11 August	(Latvia) Ķegums	(Latvia) Kristers Sergis / Artis Rasmanis	(Latvia) Kristers Sergis / Artis Rasmanis	Result
18 August	(Estonia) Saku	(Latvia) Kristers Sergis / Artis Rasmanis	(Latvia) Kristers Sergis / Artis Rasmanis	Result
18 August	(Estonia) Saku	(Latvia) Kristers Sergis / Artis Rasmanis	(Latvia) Kristers Sergis / Artis Rasmanis	Result
25 August	(Sweden) Varberg	(Latvia) Kristers Sergis / Artis Rasmanis	(Netherlands) Daniël Willemsen / Dagwin Sabbe	Result
25 August	(Sweden) Varberg	(Netherlands) Daniël Willemsen / Dagwin Sabbe	(Netherlands) Daniël Willemsen / Dagwin Sabbe	Result
8 September	(Belgium) Neeroeteren	(Latvia) Kristers Sergis / Artis Rasmanis	(Netherlands) Wilfred van Werven / Eli Piccart	Result
8 September	(Belgium) Neeroeteren	(Sweden) Hendrik Söderqvist / Tobias Sylwan	(Netherlands) Wilfred van Werven / Eli Piccart	Result
15 September	(Germany) Rudersberg	(Latvia) Kristers Sergis / Artis Rasmanis	(Latvia) Kristers Sergis / Artis Rasmanis	Result
15 September	(Germany) Rudersberg	(Latvia) Kristers Sergis / Artis Rasmanis	(Latvia) Kristers Sergis / Artis Rasmanis	Result
22 September	(France) Dardon Gueugnon	(Latvia) Kristers Sergis / Artis Rasmanis	(Latvia) Kristers Sergis / Artis Rasmanis	Result
22 September	(France) Dardon Gueugnon	(Latvia) Kristers Sergis / Artis Rasmanis	(Latvia) Kristers Sergis / Artis Rasmanis	Result
29 September	(Latvia) Cēsis	Netherlands		

- The Sidecarcross des Nations is a non-championship event but part of the calendar and is denoted by a light blue background in the table above.
- Flags for passengers not shown.

== Classification ==
=== Riders ===
The top ten teams in the final overall standings were:

Position	Driver / Passenger	Equipment	Bike No	Points
1	(Latvia) Kristers Serģis / Artis Rasmanis	MTH-BSU	1	662
2	(Netherlands) Daniel Willemsen / (Belgium) Dagwin Sabbe	Zabel-VMC	2	494
3	(Netherlands) Wilfred van Werven / (Belgium) Eli Piccart	Zabel-BSU	11	434
4	(Estonia) Are Kaurit / Sven Verbrugge	MTH-AYR	5	417
5	(Germany) Marko Happich / (Netherlands) Gerwin Wijs	Zabel-VMC	9	343
6	(United Kingdom) Stuart Brown / Luke Peters	Zabel-VMC	20	332
7	(Sweden) Hendrik Soederquist / Tobias Sylwan	MTH-EML	3	283
8	(Estonia) Alvar Korjus / Jurgen Jakk	MTH-AYR	6	279
9	(Russia) Evgeni Scherbinin / Sergei Sosnovskikh	MTH-APZ	13	256
10	(France) Benoit Beaumont / (Netherlands) Henry van de Wiel	MTH-BSU	10	244

- Equipment listed is motor and frame.
