= 2016 Sidecarcross World Championship =

Motorcycle sports competition

Season
- Grands Prix: 11
- Duration: 10 April 2016–18 September 2016

Drivers
- Champions: (Belgium) Jan Hendrickx (Netherlands) Ben van den Bogaart

The 2016 FIM Sidecarcross World Championship, the 37th edition of the competition, started on 10 April and finished after eleven events on 18 September 2016.

The championship was won by Belgian rider Jan Hendrickx and his Dutch passenger Ben van den Bogaart. For Hendrickx it was the first title while van den Bogaart won his third, having previously been World Champion as passenger of Ben Adriaenssen in 2013 and 2014. Adriaenssen, with passenger Lauris Daiders, finished second, 43 points behind while British riders Stuart Brown and Josh Chamberlain came third.

The defending champions were Etienne Bax from the Netherlands and his Latvian passenger Kaspars Stupelis, winning their first-ever World Championship together in 2015, also Stupelis had been World Champion twice before with Daniël Willemsen in 2003 and 2004. Bax did however not race with Stupelis in 2016, having instead chosen his brother Robbie Bax as passenger for the season.

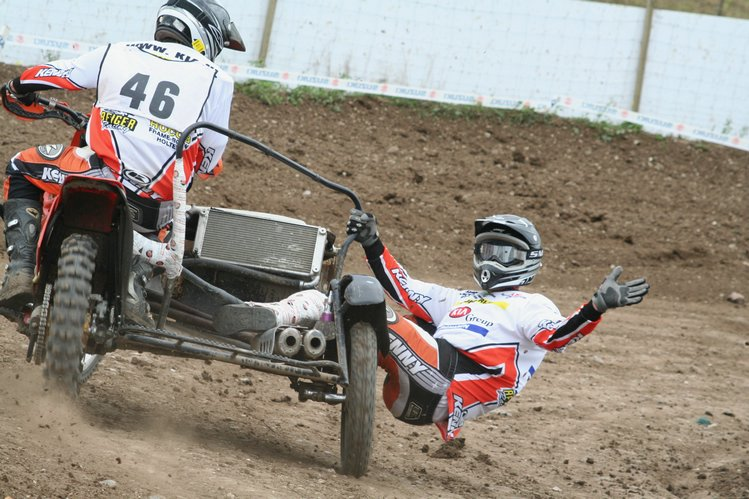
Sidecarcross passenger in action

The Sidecarcross World Championship, first held in 1980 and organised by the Fédération Internationale de Motocyclisme, is an annual competition. All races, manufacturers and the vast majority of riders in the competition being in and from Europe. Sidecarcross is similar to motocross except that the teams consist of two riders, a driver and a passenger. Races are held on the same tracks as solo motocross but the handling of the machines differs as sidecars do not lean. The majority of physical work in the sport is carried out by the passenger, who speeds up the sidecarcross in corners by leaning out. The coordination between the driver and the passenger are therefore of highest importance.

== Overview ==
The eleven Grands Prix of the season were held in eight countries; Germany held three events and the Netherlands held two, while France, Switzerland, Latvia, Czech Republic, Belgium and Estonia hosted one event. In comparison to 2015 the season was reduced from 15 to 11 events. France lost two events while Switzerland and Latvia lost one and Spain was dropped off the calendar altogether. Ukraine, who had its 2014 and 2015 Grand Prix cancelled because of political events, had originally scheduled an event but this was later moved to Germany.

== Format ==
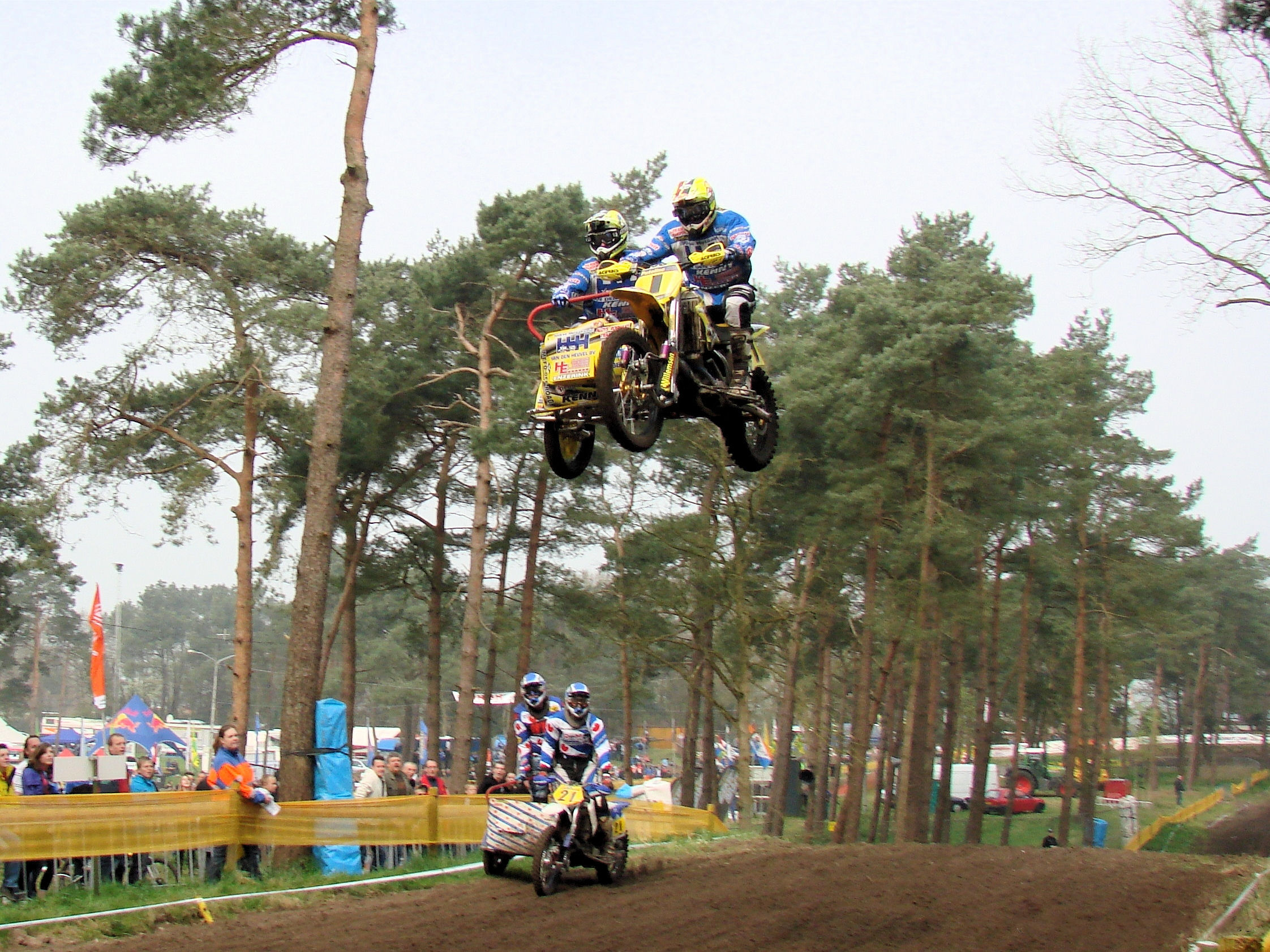
Ten time World Champion Daniël Willemsen in action in 2009

Every Grand Prix weekend was split into two races, both held on the same day. This meant that the 2016 season, with its eleven Grands Prix will have 22 races. Each race lasted for 30 minutes plus two laps. The points scored over the races were combined to determine an overall winner. In case of a tie, the results of the second race were used to determine the winner. While this overall winner received no extra world championship points, they usually were awarded a special trophy. Race start times were set at 13:30 and 16:00.

Events typically consisted of a qualifying competition, held in multiple stages on Saturdays of a race weekend while the two race events were typically held on Sundays. One exception to this rule was Easter weekends, when the races were held on Easter Monday. Race weekends could consist of additional motocross or quart support races as well, but the FIM stipulated that the World Championship races have priority. Riders had to be provided with at least one 30 minute free practice season, which was timed. A race could consist of up to 30 starters and the qualifying modus was dependent on the number of entries. Up to 32 entries, it was held in one group split into two sessions of 30 minutes each. Above 32 entries, the starter field was sub-divided into two groups through ballot and the current standings. Each qualifying group could consist of up to 30 racers. Should there be more than 60 entries, a pre-qualifying had to be held. Of the riders in the two groups, the top-twelve directly qualified for the races. The remaining teams then go to a second-chance qualifying, in which the best six advanced. The riders placed seventh and eighth remained in reserve should one of the qualified teams be unable to participate.

The FIM stipulated that all drivers and passengers must be at least 16 years old to compete, with the minimum age of drivers having come down from 18 in previous seasons, but no older than 50. Riders older than 50 had to provide a certificate of medical fitness to be permitted to compete. The driver had the right to exchange his passenger under certain conditions.

The engines permitted in the competition in 2015 were 2-stroke from 350 to 750 cc or 4-stroke up to 1,000 cc.

Starting numbers for the season were awarded according to the previous season's overall finishing position of the driver. Current or former World Champions had however the right to pick any number they wished, except the number one which was reserved for the current World Champion.

The competition was open for motor cycles with two-stroke engines from between 350 and 750cc and four-stroke engines of up to 1,000cc. Each team was permitted the use of two motorcycles with the possibility of changing machines between races.

The FIM did not permit radio communication between riders and their teams. Outside assistance during the race on the course was not permitted unless it was through race marshals in the interest of safety. Limited repairs in the designated repair zone during the race were permitted.

The first twenty teams of each race scored competition points. The point system for the 2016 season will be as follows:

Place	Points
1	25
2	22
3	20
4	18
5	16
6	15
7	14
8	13
9	12
10	11

Place	Points
11	10
12	9
13	8
14	7
15	6
16	5
17	4
18	3
19	2
20	1

== Prize money ==
In 2016 prize money will be awarded to all riders scoring points, with €300 going to each race winner, €250 to the runners-up, gradually declining from there, with €50 going to all teams placed 12th to 20th. Additionally, every team qualified for the race plus the two reserve teams received €500 in travel compensation.

== Calendar ==
The calendar for the 2016 season:

Date	Place	Race winners	GP winner	Source
10 April	(Netherlands) Oss	(Belgium) Ben Adriaenssen / (Latvia) Lauris Daiders	(Belgium) Ben Adriaenssen / (Latvia) Lauris Daiders	Result
10 April	(Netherlands) Oss	(Belgium) Ben Adriaenssen / (Latvia) Lauris Daiders	(Belgium) Ben Adriaenssen / (Latvia) Lauris Daiders	Result
8 May	(Czech Republic) Kramolín	(France) Valentin Giraud / Nicolas Musset	(France) Valentin Giraud / Nicolas Musset	Result
8 May	(Czech Republic) Kramolín	(France) Valentin Giraud / Nicolas Musset	(France) Valentin Giraud / Nicolas Musset	Result
15 May	(France) Brou	(France) Valentin Giraud / Nicolas Musset	(France) Valentin Giraud / Nicolas Musset	Result
15 May	(France) Brou	(France) Valentin Giraud / Nicolas Musset	(France) Valentin Giraud / Nicolas Musset	Result
12 June	(Germany) Schopfheim	(France) Valentin Giraud / Nicolas Musset	(France) Valentin Giraud / Nicolas Musset	Result
12 June	(Germany) Schopfheim	(France) Valentin Giraud / Nicolas Musset	(France) Valentin Giraud / Nicolas Musset	Result
19 June	(Netherlands) Valkenswaard	(Belgium) Ben Adriaenssen / (Latvia) Lauris Daiders	(Belgium) Ben Adriaenssen / (Latvia) Lauris Daiders	Result
19 June	(Netherlands) Valkenswaard	(Belgium) Ben Adriaenssen / (Latvia) Lauris Daiders	(Belgium) Ben Adriaenssen / (Latvia) Lauris Daiders	Result
10 July	(Belgium) Genk	(Belgium) Jan Hendrickx / (Netherlands) Ben van den Bogaart	(Netherlands) Etienne Bax / Robbie Bax	Result
10 July	(Belgium) Genk	(Netherlands) Etienne Bax / Robbie Bax	(Netherlands) Etienne Bax / Robbie Bax	Result
17 July	(Germany) Strassbessenbach	(Belgium) Jan Hendrickx / (Netherlands) Ben van den Bogaart	(Belgium) Ben Adriaenssen / (Latvia) Lauris Daiders	Result
17 July	(Germany) Strassbessenbach	(Belgium) Ben Adriaenssen / (Latvia) Lauris Daiders	(Belgium) Ben Adriaenssen / (Latvia) Lauris Daiders	Result
31 July	(Latvia) Stelpe	(Belgium) Ben Adriaenssen / (Latvia) Lauris Daiders	(Belgium) Ben Adriaenssen / (Latvia) Lauris Daiders	Result
31 July	(Latvia) Stelpe	(Belgium) Ben Adriaenssen / (Latvia) Lauris Daiders	(Belgium) Ben Adriaenssen / (Latvia) Lauris Daiders	Result
7 August	(Estonia) Kiviõli	(Belgium) Jan Hendrickx / (Netherlands) Ben van den Bogaart	(Belgium) Jan Hendrickx / (Netherlands) Ben van den Bogaart	Result
7 August	(Estonia) Kiviõli	(Belgium) Jan Hendrickx / (Netherlands) Ben van den Bogaart	(Belgium) Jan Hendrickx / (Netherlands) Ben van den Bogaart	Result
28 August	(Switzerland) Roggenburg	(United Kingdom) Stuart Brown / Josh Chamberlain	(United Kingdom) Stuart Brown / Josh Chamberlain	Result
28 August	(Switzerland) Roggenburg	(United Kingdom) Stuart Brown / Josh Chamberlain	(United Kingdom) Stuart Brown / Josh Chamberlain	Result
18 September	(Germany) Rudersberg	(Netherlands) Etienne Bax / Robbie Bax	(Belgium) Ben Adriaenssen / (Latvia) Lauris Daiders	Result
18 September	(Germany) Rudersberg	(Belgium) Ben Adriaenssen / (Latvia) Lauris Daiders	(Belgium) Ben Adriaenssen / (Latvia) Lauris Daiders	Result

== Classification ==
The top ten teams in the final standings:

Position	Driver / Passenger	Equipment	Bike No.	Points
1	(Belgium) Jan Hendrickx / (Netherlands) Ben van den Bogaart	Husqvarna-WSP	3	424
2	(Belgium) Ben Adriaenssen / (Latvia) Lauris Daiders	Husqvarna-WSP	14	381
3	(United Kingdom) Stuart Brown / Josh Chamberlain	Zabel-WSP	5	377
4	(Netherlands) Etienne Bax / Robbie Bax	Zabel-WSP	82	335
5	(Czech Republic) Tomas Cermak / Ondrej Cermak	MEGA-WSP	17	326
6	(Netherlands) Daniël Willemsen / Peter Beunk	Zabel-WSP	111	266
7	(United Kingdom) Brett Wilkinson / Dan Chamberlain	Zabel-WSP	12	248
8	(Netherlands) Koen Hermans / Kenny van Gaalen	Zabel-VMC	6	243
9	(France) Valentin Giraud / Nicolas Musset	KTM-WHT	2	215
10	(United Kingdom) Nick Jarvis / (Sweden) Christian Nilsson	Husqvarna-WSP	444	211
