= Kristers Serģis =

Latvian motorcycle racer

- Nationality: Latvia
- Born: January 14, 1974 (age 52); Cēsis, Latvian SSR, Soviet Union now Latvia
- Bike number: 3
- Website: Official website
Motorcycle racing career statistics
Sidecarcross World Championship
Active years	1992 - 2008
Championships	(5) 1997, 1998, 2000, 2001, 2002
2008 championship position	2nd
Starts / Wins / Podiums / Poles / F. laps / Points; 312 / 98 / 195 / / / 4,687

Kristers Serģis (born January 14, 1974) is a retired Latvian sidecarcross rider and five-time World Champion.

Kristers Serģis came to the sidecarcross sport through his father, himself a rider in the days of the Soviet Union. He made it possible for his son to take up the sport after Latvian independence in 1990. Through sponsorship from a timber building company in Cēsis, it was possible for him to turn professional, a rarity in this sport. To be able to keep the traveling distances short, Kristers now lives in the Netherlands but returns to Latvia in the off-season to work at his motorcycle dealership, "Kristers Serģis Moto".

Kristers Serģis has been voted "Latvian sports person of the year" multiple times, winning the award in 1997, 1998 and 2000.

At the end of the 2008 season, Kristers Serģis retired from the sidecarcross sport.

== Sidecarcross world championship results ==
Serģis entered the sidecarcross world championship in 1992, with Artis Rasmanis as his passenger. After two seasons with limited success and starts, he switched to Normunds Bērziņš as his partner for 1994 and 1995 but continued to have only a small impact on the race circuit. In 1996, he returned with Artis Rasmanis and in the fourth race of the season they achieved their first race win, on 21 April in Betekom, Belgium.

The season after, their fortunes improved greatly and the duo won their first of five world championships this year. In 1998, they repeated their success and in 1999 they missed out by only one point to Daniël Willemsen / Marcel Willemsen on their third triumph. Also, in 1998, they won the German sidecarcross championship. However, Serģis / Rasmanis continued their successful partnership with three more titles in 2000, 2001 and 2002. With their fifth title they became record holders in world cup wins in this sport. Previously, two drivers had archived four crowns, but none of them had five. In the 2002 season, they achieved an amazing 13 wins in a row and 24 all up. After this, Rasmanis left the team and Sven Verbrugge from Belgium became Serģis's new partner. After a second place in 2003, the team fell to seventh in 2004 due to an injury for Serģis, which put him out of action for three months, and split up after this season, Verbrugge joining Daniël Willemsen instead. In turn, Kaspars Stupelis came from Willemsen across to Serģis and the two finished runner-up in the 2005 season. In 2006, they raced in only two events and Serģis failed to score a GP victory for the first time since 1995, finishing 19th overall. The Serģis / Stupelis partnership returned in 2007 and with good results and one GP win they achieved third place in the overall standing that season. However, Daniël Willemsen overtook them as record holders, having won six titles now. Despite this, the two Latvians Serģis / Rasmanis remain the most successful outfit in the history of sidecarcross world championship since Willemsen frequently exchanged partners in his six titles.

=== Season by season ===
Season	Passenger	Equipment	Position	Points	Races	Wins	Second	Third
1992	(Latvia) Artis Rasmanis	Kawasaki-EML	46	1	3	—	—	—
1993	(Latvia) Artis Rasmanis	KTM-EML	33	25	9	—	—	—
1994	(Latvia) Normunds Bērziņš	KTM-EML	22	31	10	—	—	—
1995	(Latvia) Normunds Bērziņš	KTM-EML	18	4	20	—	—	—
1995	(Latvia) Artis Rasmanis	KTM-EML	18	11	4	—	—	—
1996	(Latvia) Artis Rasmanis	KTM-EML	6	132	16	1	1	—
1996	(Latvia) Normunds Bērziņš	KTM-EML	6	15	2	—	—	1
1997	(Latvia) Artis Rasmanis	KTM-EML	1	277	20	5	4	2
1998	(Latvia) Artis Rasmanis	Zabel-BSU	1	299	18	7	5	2
1999	(Latvia) Artis Rasmanis	Zabel-BSU	2	385	24	8	10	3
2000	(Netherlands) Ramon van Mill	MTH-BSU	1	54	4	—	1	1
2000	(Latvia) Artis Rasmanis	MTH-BSU	1	298	22	7	6	2
2001	(Latvia) Artis Rasmanis	MTH-BSU	1	534	26	16	4	3
2001	(Netherlands) Christian Verhagen	MTH-BSU	1	16	2	—	—	—
2002	(Latvia) Artis Rasmanis	MTH-BSU	1	662	28	24	1	2
2003	(Belgium) Sven Verbrugge	MTH-BSU	2	501	26	12	7	1
2004	(Belgium) Sven Verbrugge	MTH-BSU	7	246	12	6	1	2
2005	(Latvia) Kaspars Stupelis	MTH-BSU	2	440	22	7	12	—
2006	(Latvia) Kaspars Stupelis	KTM-Mefo	19	64	4	—	2	1
2007	(Latvia) Kaspars Stupelis	KTM-Mefo	3	242	16	1	8	1
2008	(Latvia) Kaspars Stupelis	KTM-AYR	2	434	24	4	12	2
	Overall 1992 - 2008			4687	312	98	74	23

Source:"The John Davey Pages - Kristers Serģis". John Davey.

- Passengers in italics.

== Honours ==
=== World Championship ===
- Champions: (5) 1997, 1998, 2000, 2001, 2002
- Runners-up: (4) 1999, 2003, 2005, 2008

=== Germany ===
- Champions: (1) 1998

=== Belgium ===
- Champions: (1) 2004

Sporting positions
Preceded by Andreas Fuhrer	Sidecarcross World Champion; 1997 - 1998	Succeeded by Daniël Willemsen
Preceded by Daniël Willemsen	Sidecarcross World Champion; 2000 - 2002	Succeeded by Daniël Willemsen
Preceded by Alois Wenninger	German national sidecarcross champion 1998	Succeeded by Klaus Weinmann
Preceded by Peter Steegmans	Belgian national sidecarcross champion 2004	Succeeded by Jan Goethals
