= 2006 Sidecarcross World Championship =

Season
- Grands Prix: 8
- Duration: 23 April–24 September

Drivers
- Champions: (Netherlands) Daniël Willemsen (Belgium) Sven Verbrugge
- Sidecarcross des Nations: Netherlands

The 2006 FIM Sidecarcross world championship, the 27th edition of the competition, started on 23 April and finished after eight race weekends on 17 September 2006 with Daniël Willemsen taking out the title once more.

== Overview ==
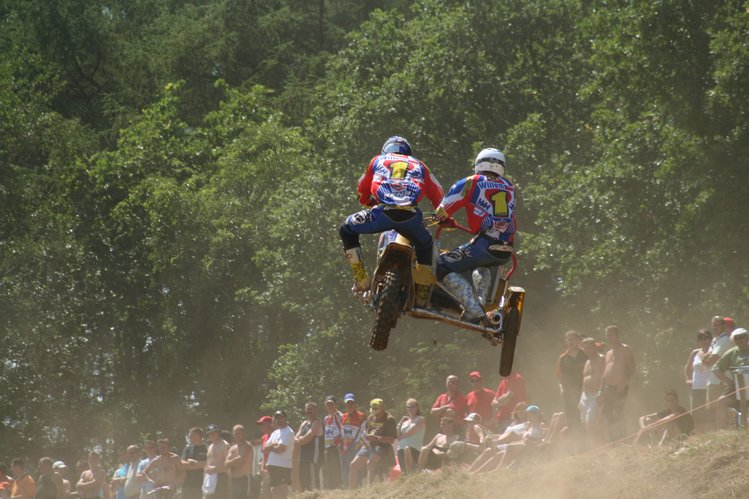
Daniël Willemsen and Sven Verbrugge in the 2006 season

The 2006 season was the 27th edition of the sidecarcross world championship. It resulted in a fifth world championship for Daniël Willemsen, his fourth in a row and the second with his passenger Sven Verbrugge from Belgium.

The two clearly dominated the season with 13 wins in the 16 races and an 83-point gap to the second placed Evgeny Scherbinin / Sergei Sosnovskikh from Russia. A close third came Marco Happich / Meinrad Schelbert, the German-Swiss combination.

After ten seasons in the top ten and five world championships, it was the first time since 1995 for last season's runner-up Kristers Serģis not to finish in the top ten. Due to injury, the Latvian only took part in four races but still achieved three podium finishes. The eight races of the season were held in six countries, France, Germany, Croatia, Belgium, Latvia and the Netherlands.

== Format ==
Every Grand Prix weekend is split into two races, both held on the same day. This means, the 2006 season with its eight Grand Prix had sixteen races. Each race is currently 30 minutes plus 2 rounds long.

Teams go through a qualifying, usually on Saturday. Typically, around 50 teams compete for 30 spots on the starting grid, meaning around 20 teams miss out on the race altogether. Some teams did not actually get a race start all season, failing in qualifying each time.

The first twenty teams of each race scored competition points, allocated accordingly to the following system:

Place	Points
1	25
2	22
3	20
4	18
5	16
6	15
7	14
8	13
9	12
10	11

Place	Points
11	10
12	9
13	8
14	7
15	6
16	5
17	4
18	3
19	2
20	1

== Retirements ==
At the end of the 2006 season a number of long-term competitors retired from the World Championship, the longest standing of those being German Josef Brustmann with 19 seasons in the competition and Belgian Geert Devoldere with 18 seasons, both first having raced in the World Championship in 1988.

== Calendar ==
The 2006 season had sixteen races:

Date	Place	Race winners	GP winner
23 April	(Netherlands) Oss	(Netherlands) Daniel Willemsen / (Belgium) Sven Verbrugge	(Netherlands) Daniel Willemsen / (Belgium) Sven Verbrugge
23 April	(Netherlands) Oss	(Netherlands) Daniel Willemsen / (Belgium) Sven Verbrugge	(Netherlands) Daniel Willemsen / (Belgium) Sven Verbrugge
21 May	(Croatia) Zabok	(Netherlands) Daniel Willemsen / (Belgium) Sven Verbrugge	(Netherlands) Daniel Willemsen / (Belgium) Sven Verbrugge
21 May	(Croatia) Zabok	(Netherlands) Daniel Willemsen / (Belgium) Sven Verbrugge	(Netherlands) Daniel Willemsen / (Belgium) Sven Verbrugge
4 June	(France) Brou	(Netherlands) Daniel Willemsen / (Belgium) Sven Verbrugge	(Netherlands) Daniel Willemsen / (Belgium) Sven Verbrugge
4 June	(France) Brou	(Netherlands) Daniel Willemsen / (Belgium) Sven Verbrugge	(Netherlands) Daniel Willemsen / (Belgium) Sven Verbrugge
18 June	(Latvia) Ķegums	(Netherlands) Daniel Willemsen / (Belgium) Sven Verbrugge	(Netherlands) Daniel Willemsen / (Belgium) Sven Verbrugge
18 June	(Latvia) Ķegums	(Netherlands) Daniel Willemsen / (Belgium) Sven Verbrugge	(Netherlands) Daniel Willemsen / (Belgium) Sven Verbrugge
2 July	(Belgium) Neeroeteren	(Netherlands) Daniel Willemsen / (Belgium) Sven Verbrugge	(Netherlands) Daniel Willemsen / (Belgium) Sven Verbrugge
2 July	(Belgium) Neeroeteren	(Netherlands) Daniel Willemsen / (Belgium) Sven Verbrugge	(Netherlands) Daniel Willemsen / (Belgium) Sven Verbrugge
20 August	(Germany) Teutschenthal	(Latvia) Māris Rupeiks / Haralds Kurpnieks	(Latvia) Māris Rupeiks / Haralds Kurpnieks
20 August	(Germany) Teutschenthal	(Germany) Josef Brustmann / Stefan Urich	(Latvia) Māris Rupeiks / Haralds Kurpnieks
13 September	(France) Saint-Jean-d'Angle	(Netherlands) Daniel Willemsen / (Belgium) Sven Verbrugge	(Netherlands) Daniel Willemsen / (Belgium) Sven Verbrugge
13 September	(France) Saint-Jean-d'Angle	(Netherlands) Daniel Willemsen / (Belgium) Sven Verbrugge	(Netherlands) Daniel Willemsen / (Belgium) Sven Verbrugge
17 September	(Germany) Rudersberg	(Germany) Marco Happich / (United Kingdom) Mark Watson	(Sweden) Henrik Soderqvist / (United Kingdom) Collin Dunkley
17 September	(Germany) Rudersberg	(Netherlands) Daniel Willemsen / (Belgium) Sven Verbrugge	(Sweden) Henrik Soderqvist / (United Kingdom) Collin Dunkley
24 September	(Latvia) Ķegums	Netherlands	

- The Sidecarcross des Nations in Ķegums on 24 September 2006 is a non-championship event but part of the calendar and is denoted by a light blue background in the table above.
- Passengers in italics.

== Classification ==
=== Riders ===
The final standings in the overall table of the 2006 season were:

Position	Driver / Passenger	Equipment	Points	Wins	Second	Third
1	(Netherlands) Daniël Willemsen / (Belgium) Sven Verbrugge	Zabel-VMC	341	13	—	—
2	(Russia) Evgeny Scherbinin / Sergei Sosnovskikh	MTH-APZ	258	—	5	3
3	(Germany) Marko Happich / (Switzerland) Meinrad Schelbert *	Zabel-VMC	243	1	1	2
4	(Latvia) Māris Rupeiks / Haralds Kurpnieks	KTM-AYR	231	1	4	2
5	(Belgium) Jan Hendrickx / Tim Smeuninx	Zabel-VMC	217	—	—	1
6	(Switzerland) Andy Burgler / Martin Betschart	KTM-VMC	211	—	2	2
7	(Belgium) Joris Hendrickx / Eli Piccart	KTM-AYR	180	—	—	1
8	(United Kingdom) Stuart Brown / Luke Peters	Zabel-VMC	165	—	—	1
9	(Czech Republic) Vaclav Rozehnal / Marek Rozehnal	Zabel-VMC	157	—	—	1
10	(Netherlands) Marcel Willemsen / Bjorn Roes	Zabel-VMC	137	—	—	—
11	(Germany) Josef Brustmann / Stefan Urich	KTM-NPH	117	1	—	—
12	(Latvia) Jānis Daiders / Lauris Daiders	Zabel-VMC	115	—	—	—
13	(Belgium) Nicky Pulinx / Ludo Somers	KTM-AYR	113	—	—	—
14	(Netherlands) Jarno van den Boomen / Henry van de Wiel	MTH-VMC	100	—	1	1
15	(Netherlands) Carlo van Duijnhoven / Christian Verhagen	MTH-VMC	100	—	—	—
16	(Switzerland) Ueli Müller / Reto Grütter	Zabel-MTH	100	—	—	—
17	(Netherlands) Eric Schrijver / Ramon van Mil	MTH-VMC	93	—	—	—
18	(Czech Republic) Tomas Cermak / Ondrej Cermak	JAWA-VMC	68	—	—	—
19	(Latvia) Kristers Serģis / Kaspars Stupelis	KTM-Mefo	64	—	2	1
20	(United Kingdom) John Watson / Mark Watson	Zabel-VMC	57	—	—	—
21	(Austria) Bertram Martin / (Switzerland) Bruno Kaelin	Zabel-VMC	57	—	—	—
22	(Germany) Martin Walter / Andre Saam	Zabel-VMC	54	—	—	—
23	(Sweden) Henrik Söderqvist / (United Kingdom) Collin Dunkley	Husaberg-VMC	52	—	1	1
24	(United Kingdom) Scott Wilkinson / Gary Burt	Zabel-VMC	52	—	—	—
25	(Belgium) Kristof Santermans / (Netherlands) Patrick Nieuwenhuizen	Yamaha-VMC	47	—	—	—
26	(United Kingdom) John Lyne / Michael Turner	Zabel-VMC	26	—	—	—
27	(France) Laurent Devoldre / Sebastian Devoldre	Husaberg-VMC	20	—	—	—
28	(Netherlands) Thijs Derks / Roy Derks	Husaberg-BSU	17	—	—	—
29	(France) Michael Poirier / Bertrand Poirier	KTM-VMC	14	—	—	—
30	(Belgium) Geert Devoldere / (France) Guennady Auvray	Honda-EML	13	—	—	—
31	(Germany) Werner Wittmann / Mario Wohlfart	Zabel-AYR	10	—	—	—
32	(Belgium) Andreas Clohse / Guido Schlabertz	Zabel-VMC	10	—	—	—
33	(Netherlands) Marcel Grondman / Martijn Geerdink	Zabel-VMC	9	—	—	—
34	(Switzerland) Roland Sutter / Sandro Michelleto	KTM-VMC	9	—	—	—
35	(Sweden) Patrick Fagerberg / Daniel Fagerberg	KTM-AYR	9	—	—	—
36	(Netherlands) Wim Janssen / Henk Roenhorst	Zabel-VMC	8	—	—	—
37	(Netherlands) Maikel Kuster / Wilfried Keuben	Zabel-VMC	8	—	—	—
38	(Netherlands) Johan Smit / Bart Notten	Husaberg-BSU	7	—	—	—
39	(Netherlands) Patrick Greup / Marc van Deutekom	KTM-VMC	7	—	—	—
40	(Lithuania) Imantas Tamuliūnas / Egidijus Karaliūnas	KTM-AYR	6	—	—	—
41	(Germany) Jens Bochmann / Stefan Progscha	Zabel-AYR	6	—	—	—
42	(France) Jean Marie Ains / Bernard Jayet	Zabel-VMC	5	—	—	—
43	(France) Baptiste Bigand / Julien Bigand	MTH-BSU	5	—	—	—
44	(Estonia) Andrus Vaks / Raimo Kaul	KTM-AYR	4	—	—	—
45	(Belgium) Boudewijn Gommeren / Steve van Tongerlo	KTM-AYR	4	—	—	—
46	(United Kingdom) David Keane / Andy Heighes	MTH-VMC	3	—	—	—
47	(France) David Surcin / Landry Tessier	Zabel-VMC	3	—	—	—
48	(Latvia) Otomārs Skreija / Gastons Skreija	MTH-BSU	2	—	—	—
49	(France) Herve Boursaud / Edouard Chereau	KTM-VMC	1	—	—	—
50	(France) Guillaume Martin / Jacques Pilleir	Zabel-VMC	1	—	—	—

- Equipment listed is motor and frame.
- Marko Happichs only win of the season came with Mark Watson as passenger, who raced at the German GP with him.
