= Daniël Willemsen =

Dutch sidecarcross rider (born 1975)

- Nationality: Netherlands
- Born: May 7, 1975 (age 51); Lochem, Netherlands
- Bike number: 111
- Website: Team Willemsen website
Motorcycle racing career statistics
Sidecarcross World Championship
Active years	1994 – present
Manufacturers	Honda-EML (1994–1995) Zabel-EML (1996) Zabel-BSU (1997–2001) Zabel-VMC (2002–2009) Zabel-WSP (2010–present)
Championships	(10) 1999, 2003, 2004, 2005, 2006, 2007, 2008, 2010, 2011, 2012
2015 championship position	4th
Starts / Wins / Podiums / Poles / F. laps / Points; 427 / 197 / 299 / / / 7,763

Daniël Johan Nico Willemsen (born 7 May 1975 in Lochem, Gelderland) is a Dutch sidecarcross rider and ten times World Champion.

Willemsen is the most successful rider in sidecarcross history, winning the title ten times, in 1999, 2003, 2004, 2005, 2006, 2007, 2008, 2010, 2011 and 2012. He has also won the Dutch national sidecarcross championship nine times, winning it last in 2008 and the Belgian championship twice.

For his success in motor sport, Willemsen was made a member of the Order of Orange-Nassau in 2005. His home town Lochem also has named a street after him in 2005. He is the most successful World Championship sidecarcross rider and his ten titles place him seventh, as of 2011, in the all-time FIM World Champions list, with Giacomo Agostini with 15 titles at the top.

In 2007, Willemsen took part in the Dakar Rally, finishing tenth in the solo motorcycle class. To make up for the canceled Dakar Rally 2008, he took part in the Tuareq Rally in March/April 2008, winning the race.

== Biography ==
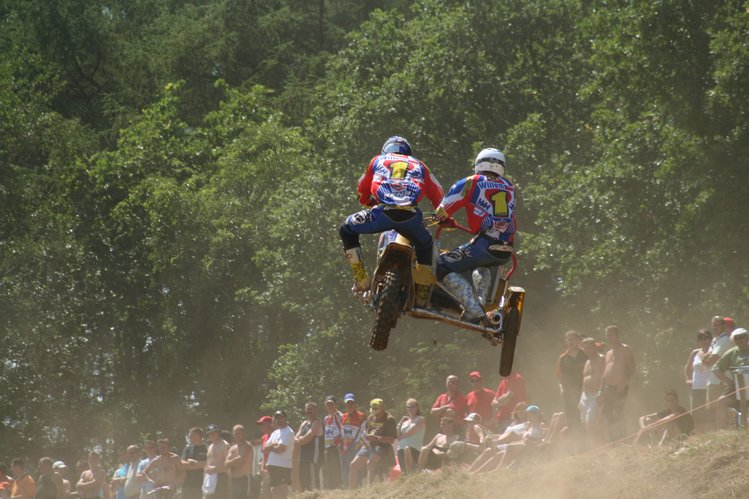
Daniël Willemsen in race action

Willemsen's sidecar experience started in 1981, when he and his brother Marcel, aged six and four, drove in a home-made Hond 50 cc side car, under the guidance of their father Berry, who had also been a sidecar racer. However, it took the brothers another ten years before they were allowed to take part in sidecar races.

The two brothers entered the senior Dutch championship in 1994, but were barred from racing together in the World Championship because Marcel was not yet 18 years old and Daniël had to find a different passenger instead. Marcel joined his brother in this competition 1995, when he was finally old enough. Willemsen's first World Championship race was in 1994 at the Dutch Grand Prix. After teaming up with his brother in 1995, who later became a world championship rider in his own right, his track record started to improve. The two brothers won their first race on 12 May 1996 when they won race two in Baugé, France. The Wiilemsens won their first Grand Prix in 1997 in Estonia.

After finishing third in 1997, suffering a bad accident at the German GP, and second in 1998, the two won their first world championship in 1999, taking it out by one point and beating the then current champions Kristers Serģis / Artis Rasmanis.

In February 2000, the two brothers had a serious accident in a training run in Italy, which saw Marcel temporarily parallised and unable to continue his career. In his stead, for the next two seasons, Sven Verbrugge from Belgium became Daniël's partner and the two finished second in the overall standing in 2000 and 2001. 2002 saw a repeat of this result, now with Alfons Eggers as his passenger. With Kaspars Stupelis from Latvia as his partner, he won the 2003 and 2004 world championship. Sven Verbrugge returned for the 2005 and 2006 season and they took out two more world championships together. In 2007, the Swiss Reto Grütter was Daniël's partner and with him he won his record sixth title. In the 2008 season, Willemsen again raced with Reto Grütter as his partner. An injury prevented Grütter from taking part in the first race of the season and Willemsen replaced him with Bruno Kaelin for the first round. In race fourteen of the season, the team was disqualified after winning the race due to Grütter losing a glove, after a protest by Kristers Serģis. The duo won the 2008 championship convincingly, with a 97 point gap to the second-placed Kristers Serģis.

For the 2009 World Championship, Willemsen was teaming up in the first GP with Belgian passenger Dagwin Sabbe, continuing his habit of changing passengers at regular interval. From the second event onwards, he used veteran passenger Sven Verbrugge once more. On 5 July 2009, Willemsen broke his collar bone in a Dutch championship race, ruling him out of racing in a decisive phase of the world championship, just before the end of a summer break in the competition. The duo missed the three following events, thereby losing the leadership in the competition. Upon return, the team could not achieve the same dominance as before Willemsen's injury and finished only fifth in the overall standings, having to let the Belgian-Latvian team of Joris Hendrickx and Kaspars Liepiņš take out the championship. In the last event of the season, Verbrugge broke his thumb and the team was unable to score any points. Daniël Willemsen however declared already before the race that he would try to win title number eight in 2010, which he successfully did.

In 2011, Willemsen started once more with 43-year-old Sven Verbrugge as his passenger, after an injury to first-choice passenger Roman Vasyliaka. It is the fifth time that Willemsen and Verbrugge are racing together in the competition. Willemsen temporarily switched to Ondrej Cermak as his passenger for the first of two German GP's because of an injury to Verbrugge. Willemsen and his passenger clinched the World Championship at the second-last race of the season, at Slagelse, Denmark, having a 53 point lead over Latvians Jānis and Lauris Daiders at the time.

Willemsen already announced that he would aim for title number ten in 2012. The last race event of the 2011 season saw the World Champions, Willemsen and Verbrugge, failing to score any points. A dispute during qualifying between the two lead to Verbrugge walking out during the first qualifying session. He later returned to take part in the "last chance", where the team qualified for the race after all. Verbrugge however was injured during a fall and had to be taken to hospital where his arm was placed into a plaster, ruling the team out of the race.

Willemsen took out his tenth title in 2012 despite having to use three different passengers throughout the season. Haralds Kurpnieks broke his wrist in the first Grand Prix of the season and replacement Kenny van Gaalen suffered a knee injury in the second French Grand Prix, making Lauris Daiders his passenger for the last five GP's.

At the opening GP of the 2013 season in Fraunefeld, Switzerland, Willemsen suffered eleven fractures when his sidecar overturned and he had to be removed by paramedics. A broken collarbone and five broken ribs meant he miss a large number of races of the 2013 season and was unable to defend his title.

The 2014 season saw a return of Robbie Bax, brother of competitor Etienne Bax, as his passenger despite major disagreements between him and Willemsen. The pair won the opening race of the season but had an accident at the second race at Oss, leaving Willemsen concussed. The team missed the last two grand prix of the season because of injury and finished ninth overall in the World Championship.

The 2015 season, with Robbie Bax as his passenger again, saw Willemsen win his first GP since August 2012 when he won the event at Genk, Belgium, on 28 June, and finish the season in fourth place overall. Willemsen, with new passenger Peter Beunk, started the 2016 season well, leading the World Championship after three events, but then suffered multiple fractures in his jaw in the qualifying for the fourth event and was forced to miss Grand Prix because of the injury.

=== Season by season ===
In some seasons, Willemsen used multiple passengers throughout the year:

Season	Passenger	Equipment	Position	Points	Races	Wins	Second	Third
1994	(Netherlands) Reiner Stuyvenberg	Honda-EML	23	30	2	—	1	—
1995	(France) Bruno Bouvet	Honda-EML	25	8	2	—	—	—
1995	(Netherlands) Christian Verhagen	Honda-EML	25	4	2	—	—	—
1995	(Netherlands) Marcel Willemsen	Honda-EML	25	10	2	—	—	—
1996	(Netherlands) Marcel Willemsen	Zabel-EML	12	82	16	2	—	—
1997	(Netherlands) Marcel Willemsen	Zabel-BSU	3	231	14	5	4	2
1997	(Belgium) Sven Verbrugge	Zabel-BSU	3	40	2	2	—	—
1998	(Netherlands) Marcel Willemsen	Zabel-BSU	2	279	18	6	7	2
1999	(Netherlands) Marcel Willemsen	Zabel-BSU	1	386	24	13	5	1
2000	(Belgium) Sven Verbrugge	Zabel-BSU	2	320	22	5	4	7
2001	(Belgium) Sven Verbrugge	Zabel-BSU	2	377	22	8	5	3
2001	(Czech Republic) Premsyl Novotny	Zabel-BSU	2	50	2	2	—	—
2002	(Belgium) Alfons Eggers	Zabel-VMC	2	145	8	1	5	—
2002	(Belgium) Sven Verbrugge	Zabel-VMC	2	88	4	—	4	—
2002	(Netherlands) Bart Notten	Zabel-VMC	2	86	4	—	3	1
2002	(Belgium) Dagwin Sabbe	Zabel-VMC	2	199	12	1	5	1
2003	(Latvia) Kaspars Stupelis	Zabel-VMC	1	561	24	13	9	—
2004	(Latvia) Kaspars Stupelis	Zabel-VMC	1	572	26	18	4	1
2005	(Belgium) Sven Verbrugge	Zabel-VMC	1	478	22	15	4	—
2006	(Belgium) Sven Verbrugge	Zabel-VMC	1	341	16	13	—	—
2007	(Switzerland) Reto Grütter	Zabel-VMC	1	375	16	15	—	—
2008	(Switzerland) Bruno Kaelin	Zabel-VMC	1	36	2	—	—	1
2008	(Switzerland) Reto Grütter	Zabel-VMC	1	495	22	19	—	1
2009	(Belgium) Dagwin Sabbe	Zabel-VMC	5	25	2	1	—	—
2009	(Belgium) Sven Verbrugge	Zabel-VMC	5	341	17	11	—	—
2010	(Netherlands) Gertie Eggink	Zabel-WSP	1	481	24	14	1	3
2010	(Belgium) Dagwin Sabbe	Zabel-WSP	1	75	4	1	1	—
2011	(Netherlands) Sven Verbrugge	Zabel-WSP	1	437	21	14	3	—
2011	(Czech Republic) Ondřej Čermák	Zabel-WSP	1	50	2	2	—	—
2012	(Latvia) Haralds Kurpnieks	Zabel-WSP	1	0	1	—	—	—
2012	(Netherlands) Kenny van Gaalen	Zabel-WSP	1	249	10	5	4	1
2012	(Latvia) Lauris Daiders	Zabel-WSP	1	204	10	6	2	0
2013	(Netherlands) Robbie Bax	Zabel-WSP	21	49	7	—	—	—
2013	(Belgium) Dagwin Sabbe	Zabel-WSP	21	30	2	—	—	—
2014	(Netherlands) Robbie Bax	Zabel-WSP	9	179	14	1	—	—
2015	(Netherlands) Robbie Bax	Zabel-WSP	4	505	29	4	2	4
2016	(Netherlands) Peter Beunk	Zabel-WSP						
Overall 1994 – 2016				7,763	427	197	73	28

Source:"The John Davey Pages – DANIEL WILLEMSEN". John Davey.

- Passengers in italics.

== Rallies ==
Year	Rally	Team	Number	Equipment	Position
2007	Dakar-rally	Yamaha Holland Team	233	Yamaha WR 450F	48th
2008	Dakar-rally	Yamaha Holland Team	47	Yamaha WR 450F	race canceled
2008	Touareg-rally	Rally Team Touareg Rally 2008	75	Yamaha WR 450F	1st
2009	Dakar-rally	Yamaha Holland Team	47	Yamaha WR 450F	21st

== Honours ==
=== World Championship ===
- Champions: (10) 1999, 2003, 2004, 2005, 2006, 2007, 2008, 2010, 2011, 2012
- Runners-up: (4) 1998, 2000, 2001, 2002

=== Netherlands ===
- Champions: (9) 1998, 1999, 2001, 2002, 2003, 2004, 2006, 2007, 2008
- Runners-up: (3) 1997, 2005, 2015

=== Belgium ===
- Champions: (2) 2006, 2007

Sporting positions
Preceded by Kristers Serģis	Sidecarcross World Champion; 1999	Succeeded by Kristers Serģis
Preceded by Kristers Serģis	Sidecarcross World Champion; 2003–2008	Succeeded by Joris Hendrickx
Preceded by Joris Hendrickx	Sidecarcross World Champion; 2010–2012	Succeeded by Ben Adriaenssen
Preceded by Jacky Janssen	Dutch national sidecarcross champion 1998, 1999	Succeeded by Jacky Janssen
Preceded by Jacky Janssen	Dutch national sidecarcross champion 2001–2004	Succeeded by Eric Schrijver
Preceded by Eric Schrijver	Dutch national sidecarcross champion 2006–2008	Succeeded by Peter Steegmans
Preceded by Jan Goethals	Belgian national sidecarcross champion 2006–2007	Succeeded by Joris Hendrickx
