= Artis Rasmanis =

Latvian motorcycle racer and politician

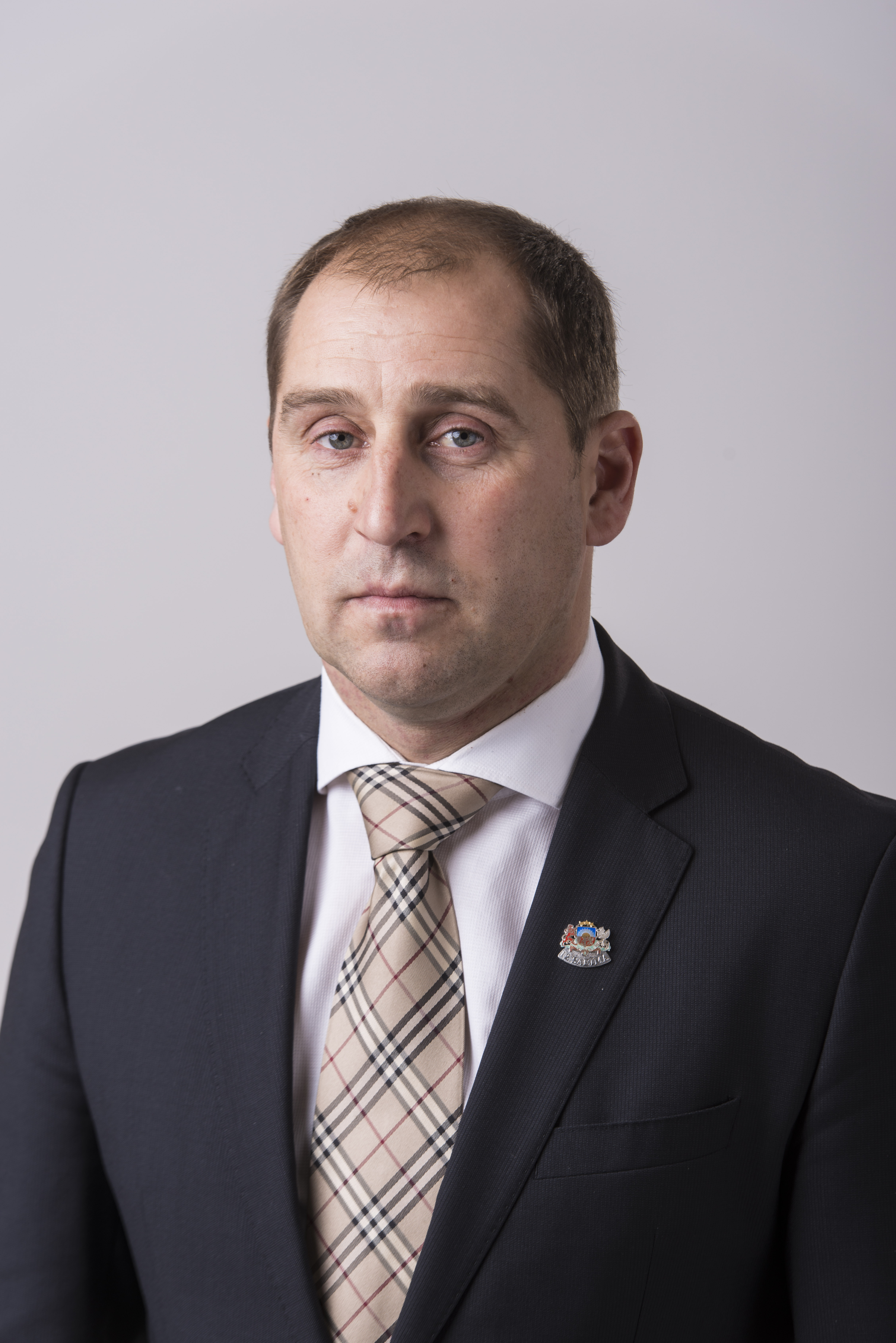
- Rasmanis in 2014 as a deputy of Saeima
- Nationality: Latvia
- Born: 28 July 1971 (age 55); Cēsis, Latvian SSR
- Bike number: n/a
Motorcycle racing career statistics
Sidecarcross World Championship
Active years	1992–2002
Championships	(5) 1997, 1998, 2000, 2001, 2002
2002 championship position	1st u
Starts / Wins / Podiums / Poles / F. laps / Points; 170 / 68 / 113 / / / 2,624

Artis Rasmanis (born 1971) is a retired Latvian sidecarcross passenger and five times World Champion.

Rasmanis was part of the most successful partnership in sidecarcross world championship history, winning five titles with his driver Kristers Serģis. He retired from international sidecar competition after their fifth title in 2002. He is however still active in the motor sport, racing quad bikes now, finishing 12th in the FIM European championship in 2007.

He now works as a manager at SIA "Rasmanis & Dankers". He originally graduated as an agricultural machinery mechanic from Priekuļi agricultural technical school in Cēsis district in 1990.

In 2014, Rasmanis was elected as a deputy of the Saeima from the Union of Greens and Farmers.

== Sidecarcross world championship results ==
Artis Rasmanis entered the sidecarcross world championship in 1992, with Kristers Serģis as his driver. After two seasons with limited success and starts, Serģis switched to Normunds Bērziņš as his partner for 1994 and 1995 but continued to have only a small impact on the race circuit. In late 1995 Artis Rasmanis returned as his partner and in 1996, in the fourth race of the season they achieved their first race win, on 21 April in Betekom, Belgium. The season after, their fortunes improved greatly and the duo won their first of five world championships this year. In 1998, they repeated their success and in 1999 they missed out by only one point to Daniël Willemsen / Marcel Willemsen on their third triumph. Also, in 1998, they won the German sidecarcross championship. However, Serģis / Rasmanis continued their successful partnership with three more titles in 2000, 2001 and 2002. With their fifth title they became record holders in world cup wins in this sport. Previously, two drivers had archived four crowns, but none five. After this fifth title, Rasmanis retired from international competition but Serģis continued to race.

=== Season by season ===
Season	Driver	Equipment	Position	Points	Races	Wins	Second	Third
1992	(Latvia) Kristers Serģis	Kawasaki-EML	46	1	3	—	—	—
1993	(Latvia) Kristers Serģis	KTM-EML	33	25	9	—	—	—
1995	(Latvia) Kristers Serģis	KTM-EML	18	11	4	—	—	—
1996	(Latvia) Kristers Serģis	KTM-EML	6	132	16	1	1	—
1997	(Latvia) Kristers Serģis	KTM-EML	1	277	20	5	4	2
1998	(Latvia) Kristers Serģis	Zabel-BSU	1	299	18	7	5	2
1999	(Latvia) Kristers Serģis	Zabel-BSU	2	385	24	8	10	3
2000	(Latvia) Kristers Serģis	MTH-BSU	1	298	22	7	6	2
2001	(Latvia) Kristers Serģis	MTH-BSU	1	534	26	16	4	3
2002	(Latvia) Kristers Serģis	MTH-BSU	1	662	28	24	1	2
	Overall 1992 – 2002			2624	170	68	31	14

Source:"The John Davey Pages – Artis Rasmanis". John Davey.

- Passengers in italics.

== Honours ==
=== World Championship ===
- Champions: (5) 1997, 1998, 2000, 2001, 2002
- Runners-up: (1) 1999

=== Germany ===
- Champions: (1) 1998

Sporting positions
Preceded by Adrian Käser	Sidecarcross World Champion (passenger); 1997–1998	Succeeded by Marcel Willemsen
Preceded by Marcel Willemsen	Sidecarcross World Champion (passenger); 2000–2002	Succeeded by Kaspars Stupelis
Preceded by Henry van der Wiel	German national sidecarcross champion (passenger); 1998	Succeeded by Thomas Weinmann
