= Pflückuff =

- Municipality
- Coat of arms
- Interactive map of Pflückuff
- Location within Germany Location within Saxony
- Coordinates: 51°30′N 13°0′E
- Country: Germany
- State: Saxony
- District: Nordsachsen
- Disbanded: 1 January 2009
- Subdivisions: 9

Area
  - Total: 48.25 km^{2} (18.63 sq mi)
- Elevation: 92 m (302 ft)

Population (2006-12-31)
  - Total: 2,456
  - Density: 50.90/km^{2} (131.8/sq mi)
- Time zone: UTC+01:00 (CET)
  - Summer (DST): UTC+02:00 (CEST)
- Postal codes: 04860, 04889
- Dialling codes: 03421, 034221
- Vehicle registration: TO

Pflückuff is a former municipality in the district Nordsachsen, in Saxony, Germany. It was formed in 1994 by the merger of the former municipalities Beckwitz, Loßwig, Mehderitzsch, Staupitz and Weßnig. On 1 January 2009, it was absorbed into the town Torgau. Beckwitz, Loßwig, Mehderitzsch, Staupitz and Weßnig became Ortschaften (municipal divisions) of Torgau.
