= Sidecarcross =

Type of motorsport

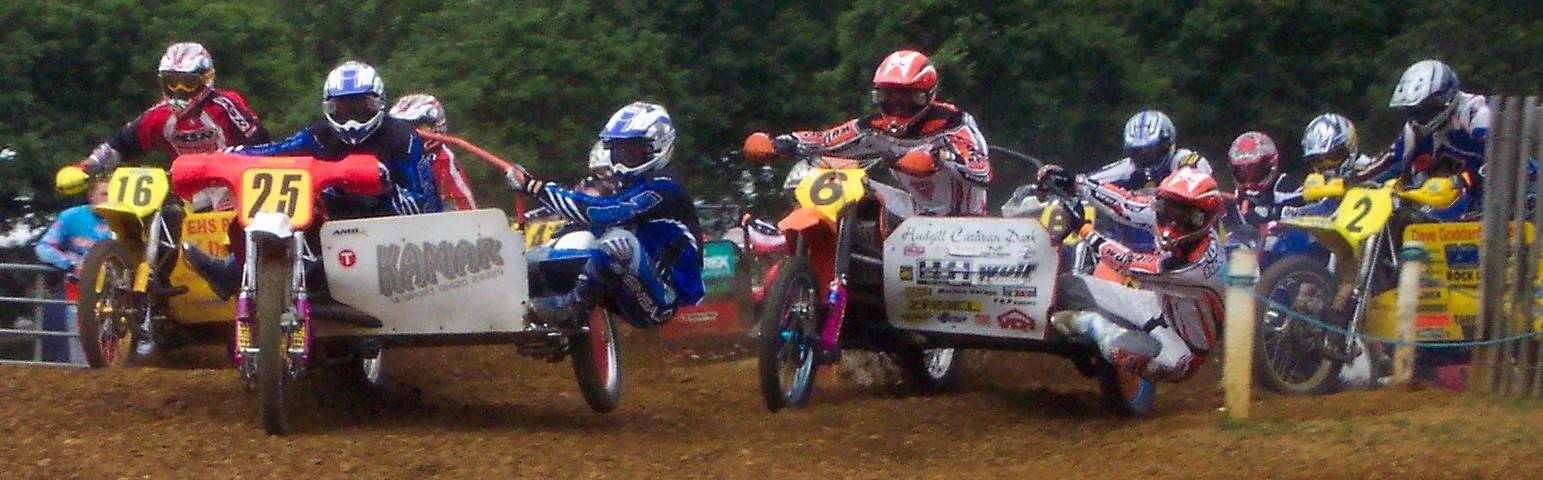
The Holeshot of a sidecarcross race

Sidecarcross racing, also known as sidecar motocross, is a branch of motocross. While regular motocross riders use solo machines, sidecarcross involves a different type of motorcycle chassis operated by a team of two people: a driver and a sidecar passenger. The earliest records suggest that sidecarcross began in the UK in the 1930s.

== Sidecarcross outfits ==
Just as with road outfits, early sidecarcross outfits were little more than a solo bike with a sidecar attached to its frame by metal tubes. As the sport developed, sidecarcross outfits became more integrated, although most retained a tubular structure rather than a monocoque chassis. Sidecarcross outfit configuration tends to echo national road outfits, with the sidecar fitted to the "nearside": UK sidecars are on the left, and European ones are on the right. Once riders are used to one arrangement, they seem reluctant to adapt the other layout. Many sidecar outfits (particularly the heavier ones) have leading link swingarm front suspension, as conventional telescopic forks are less capable of absorbing the stresses incurred.

Several sidecar manufacturers (for example VMC, Bastech and EML) in Europe make special chassis, usually with corresponding shocks, except for the engine, wheels, plastics, and other components from commonly available large-bore motocross bikes such as the Honda CR500, Kawasaki KX500, and large KTMs. There are also specialised "monster-size" 2-stroke engines such as the MTH 630, and 700cc Zabel which are made just for sidecar motocross racing. The Zabel and MTH are currently the top engines in the World Championship. HOCOB manufacturer of VMC chassis won the FIM award for the best manufacturer motocross sidecar 2007.

== Handling characteristics ==
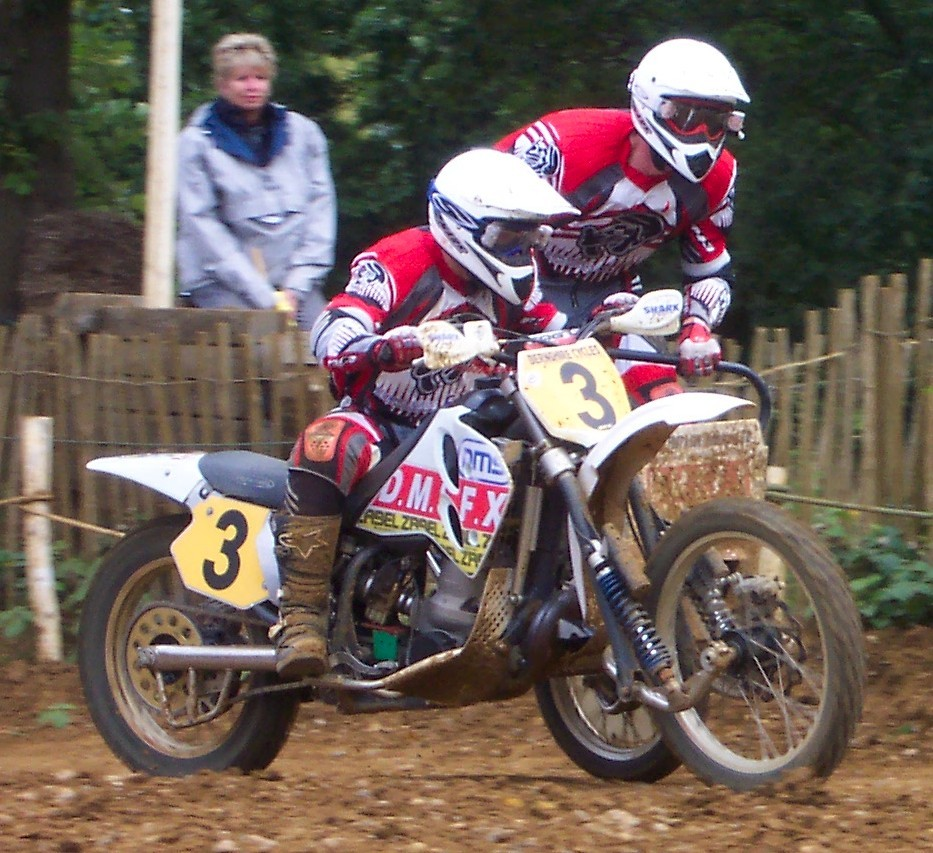
A Zabel engined outfit

Sidecarcross is carried out in the same way as regular motocross on broadly similar tracks. Just as with road outfits, the handling of sidecars is very different from solos, as the driver cannot lean the outfit in the turns to counter the centripetal forces. Instead, to ensure the outfit does not flip over, the passenger must lean out from the sidecar as much as possible in corners. The passenger (sometimes known as the "monkey") moves his whole body around continuously, and plays a much more physical role than the sedentary driver.

== Sidecarcross racing ==
One of the most important aspects of sidecar racing is teamwork; the world's top sidecar teams have been racing together for many years.

A World Championship is held over several rounds at top motocross venues throughout Europe, with a season-ending Sidecarcross des Nations. The sport is very popular in Western and Central Europe, but the sidecarcross scene in North America and Australia is much smaller. The most successful sidecarcrosser in history is ten-time world champion Daniël Willemsen of The Netherlands. However, since Willemsen won six of his titles with four different passengers, the most successful team is Kristers Sergis/Artis Rasmanis.

Each country also hosts amateur-level championships. In Belgium, for example, these include the VMCF, VLM, and MCLB federations. Notably, the MCLB federation organizes one of the largest amateur sidecarcross events each year, run by De Verre Ginstecrossers, with over 100 sidecar teams competing across two days.

There is also the European amateur championship IMBA which consists with riders from different European amateur federations namely the MON (Netherlands), VMCF (Belgium), AMCA (GB), UFOLEP (France), NRMF (Russia), SAM (Switzerland), DAMCV (Germany), DMCU (Denmark), CAM (Czech Republic) & CSEN (Italy).

== See also ==
- List of national sidecarcross champions
- Sidecarcross world championship
- The Sidehackers
