= Jaanikese =

Village in Estonia

- village
- Location in Estonia
- Coordinates: 57°48′07″N 26°03′01″E
- Country: Estonia
- County: Valga County
- Municipality: Valga Parish

Area
  - Total: 13.59 km^{2} (5.25 sq mi)

Population (01.01.2011)
  - Total: 60
  - Density: 4.4/km^{2} (11/sq mi)

Jaanikese is a village in Valga Parish, Valga County in southern Estonia. It is located just 2 km (1 mi) north of the neighbouring town Valga. Jaanikese also borders Latvia in the west and is situated between Valga–Uulu (road to Viljandi and Pärnu) and Valga–Tartu (road to Tartu, part of E264) roads. Jaanikese has a population of 60 (as of 2011) and an area of 13.59 km^{2} (5 sq mi).

Jaanikese is known for its motocross circuit where many international competitions have taken place.

Valga Airfield, former Soviet military airfield was located in Jaanikese.
