= MTH Racing engines =

MTH racing engines are two-stroke lightweight engines, built by Austrian company MTH. They are used in motocross sidecars and ultra lightweight aeroplanes.

From 2000 to 2002, the Latvian sidecarcross rider Kristers Serģis won three world championships with an MTH motor.

== Sidecarcross world championships ==
- Kristers Serģis / Artis Rasmanis - MTH-BSU - 2000-2002

== Aircraft engines ==
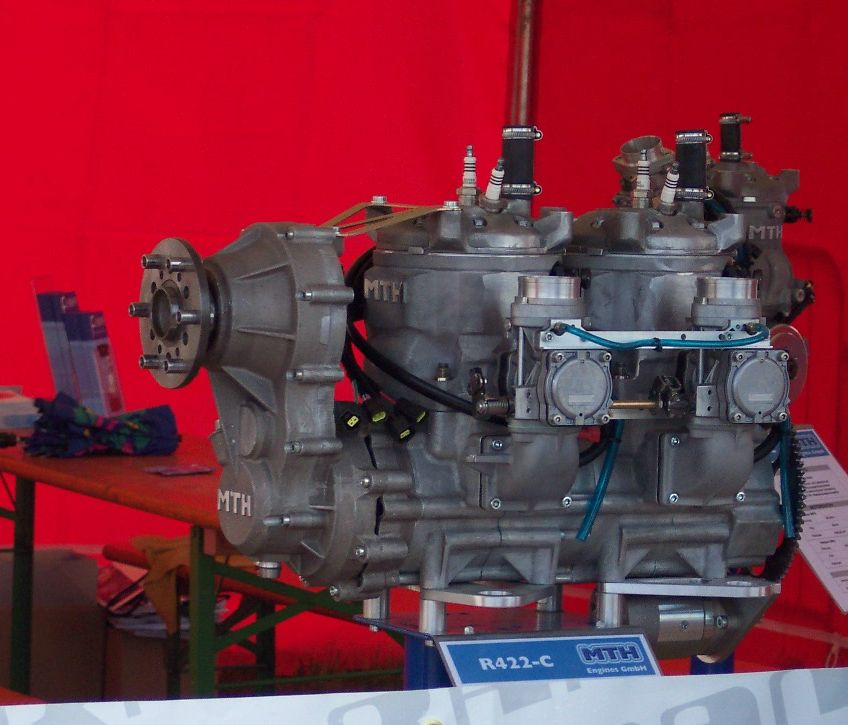
MTH R 422-CG

- MTH R 422-CG
