= EML Sidecars =

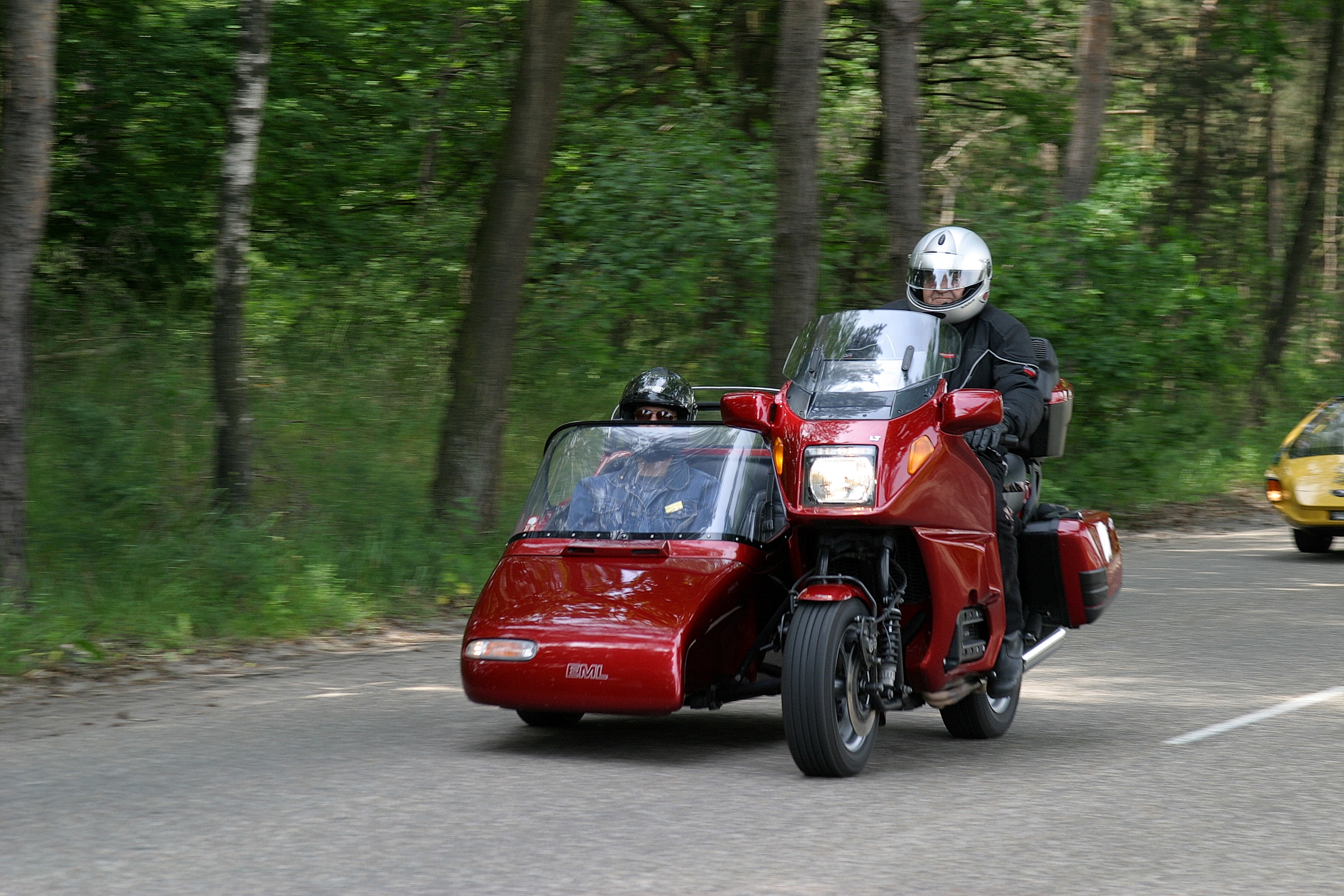
Motorcycle with sidecar

The EML Sidecars company, short EML, is a Dutch Sidecarcross and Quad frame manufacturer, having won numerous world championships in this sport.

EML stands for "Eigen Makelij", meaning made myself.

== History ==
The company was formed by Hennie Winkelhuis in 1972. He built, in his factory in Neede, completely new frames for motorcycles that originally were not very well suited to be combined with a sidecar. Winkelhuis later sold his company to concentrate on W-Tec and his Quad production but presented a somewhat revolutionary sidecarcross in 2001. He was however unable to pursue this project because of illness and died in May 2007.

EML suffered also a bankruptcy in 1993, but managed to resume activities after a brief suspension of all activities.

The motocross part of the company is now owned by Alex Brusselers and Jan op t Hoog, who, in cooperation with EML-W-Tec, aim to return the name to sidecarcross success once more. In the 2009 season however, no team in the sidecarcross world championship used an EML frame.

EML-W-Tec nowadays produces road bikes, sidecars and trikes.

== Sidecarcross world championships ==
EML's most successful time was in the 1980s and early 1990s, when a number of teams won world championships with their products:

- Emil Bollhalder / Karl Büsser – Yamaha-EML – 1982–83
- Hansi Bächtold / Fritz Fuß – EML/Jumbo-EML – 1984–87
- Benny Janssen / Tiny Janssen - Honda-EML – 1990
- Eimbert Timmermans / Eric Verhagen – Kawasaki-EML - 1991-92
- Kristers Sergis / Artis Rasmanis – KTM-EML - 1997

== Sources ==
- The world championship on sidecarcross.com
- The official FIM website
