= Zabel (engine) =

German two-stroke motocross engine

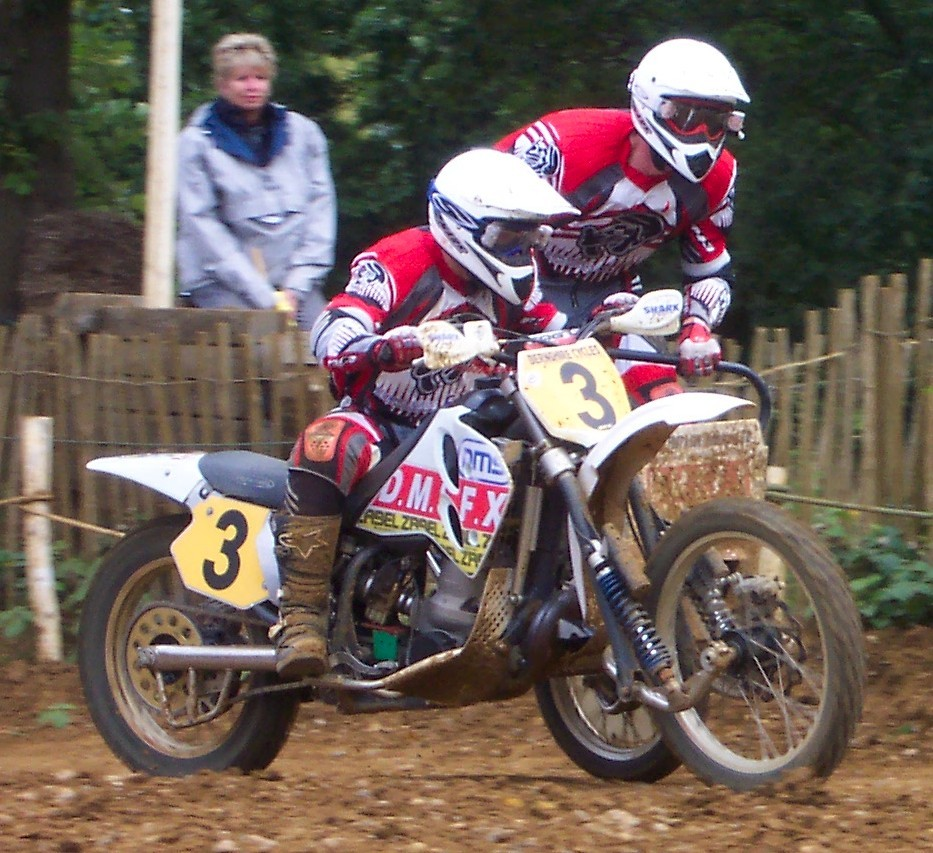
A Zabel powered sidecar racing in the UK.

A Zabel is a German two-stroke motocross engine, mainly used in Sidecarcross.

Zabel engines have won the Sidecarcross world championship in 1998 - driven by Kristers Sergis from Latvia then 1999, 2003, 2004, 2005, 2006, 2007, 2008, 2010, 2011 and 2012 driven by Daniel Willemsen from the Netherlands at 2015 with Kaspars and Etienne at 2017 with Etienne and Nicolas Musset and at 2018 with Ben van den and driver as Marvine.

Prior to 1990 a 610cc Zabel manufactured big-bore conversion was available for large bore Maico motocross engines. From 1990 to 1996 both 620cc and 685cc versions of Zabel's own engine were available. The 620 version was then discontinued with the 685cc version remaining available until the end of 1998. In 1999 a new 700cc version of the engine was released with hydraulic clutch and many modifications. This engine has been in continuous development since. The most recent ZM29 model was released in 2010 but improved to be ZM30.
