= 2015 Sidecarcross World Championship =

Season
- Grands Prix: 15
- Duration: 6 April 2015–20 September 2015

Drivers
- Champions: (Netherlands) Etienne Bax (Latvia) Kaspars Stupelis
- Sidecarcross des Nations: Netherlands

The 2015 FIM Sidecarcross World Championship, the 36th edition of the competition, started on 6 April and finished after fifteen events on 20 September 2015.

The defending champions were Ben Adriaenssen from Belgium and his Dutch passenger Ben van den Bogaart, who won the 2013 and 2014 World championships together. Adriaenssen suffered a foot injury during the fourth Grand Prix of the season, at the time sitting in second place of the World Championship, and was forced to miss the remainder of the season. Van den Bogaart later rejoined the series at the seventh round, partnering Belgian rider Jan Hendrickx.

The 2015 World Championship was won by Etienne Bax and Kaspars Stupelis. Second placed, 96 points behind, was French rider Valentin Giraud, who was partnered by compatriot Nicolas Musset for most of the season; however, Latvia's Elvijs Mucenieks partnered Giraud at the final three events of the season as Musset suffered a foot injury. Third place – on equal points with Giraud and his partners – went to Hendrickx, who was partnered by Mucenieks for the first six races and van den Bogaart for the remainder of the season.

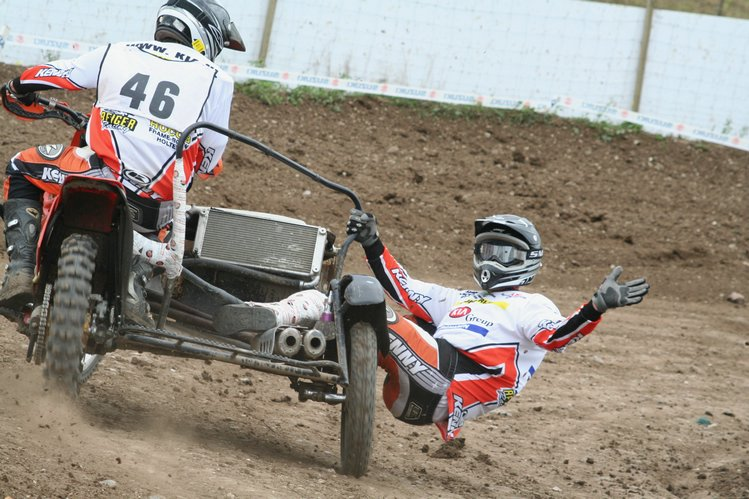
Sidecarcross passenger in action

The Sidecarcross World Championship, first held in 1980 and organised by the Fédération Internationale de Motocyclisme, is an annual competition. All races, manufacturers and the vast majority of riders in the competition being in and from Europe. Sidecarcross is similar to motocross except that the teams consist of two riders, a driver and a passenger. Races are held on the same tracks as solo motocross but the handling of the machines differs as sidecars do not lean. The majority of physical work in the sport is carried out by the passenger, who speeds up the sidecarcross in corners by leaning out. The coordination between the driver and the passenger are therefore of highest importance.

== Overview ==
The fifteen Grands Prix of the season were held in nine countries; Germany and France held three events, Switzerland and Latvia held two events), while the Czech Republic, the Netherlands, Belgium, Estonia and Spain all hosted one event. In comparison to the 2014 season five extra Grands Prix were added. Germany increased its number of Grands Prix from two to three while Latvia increased theirs from one to two. The Belgian Grand Prix was re-added to the season after having been cancelled in 2014 because of bad weather. Ukraine, who had its 2014 Grand Prix cancelled because of the political situation in the country, originally received a Grand Prix for 2015 but this event was removed from the calendar again. Switzerland also had its number of Grands Prix increased from one to two while Spain had not been on the calendar since 2005.

== Format ==
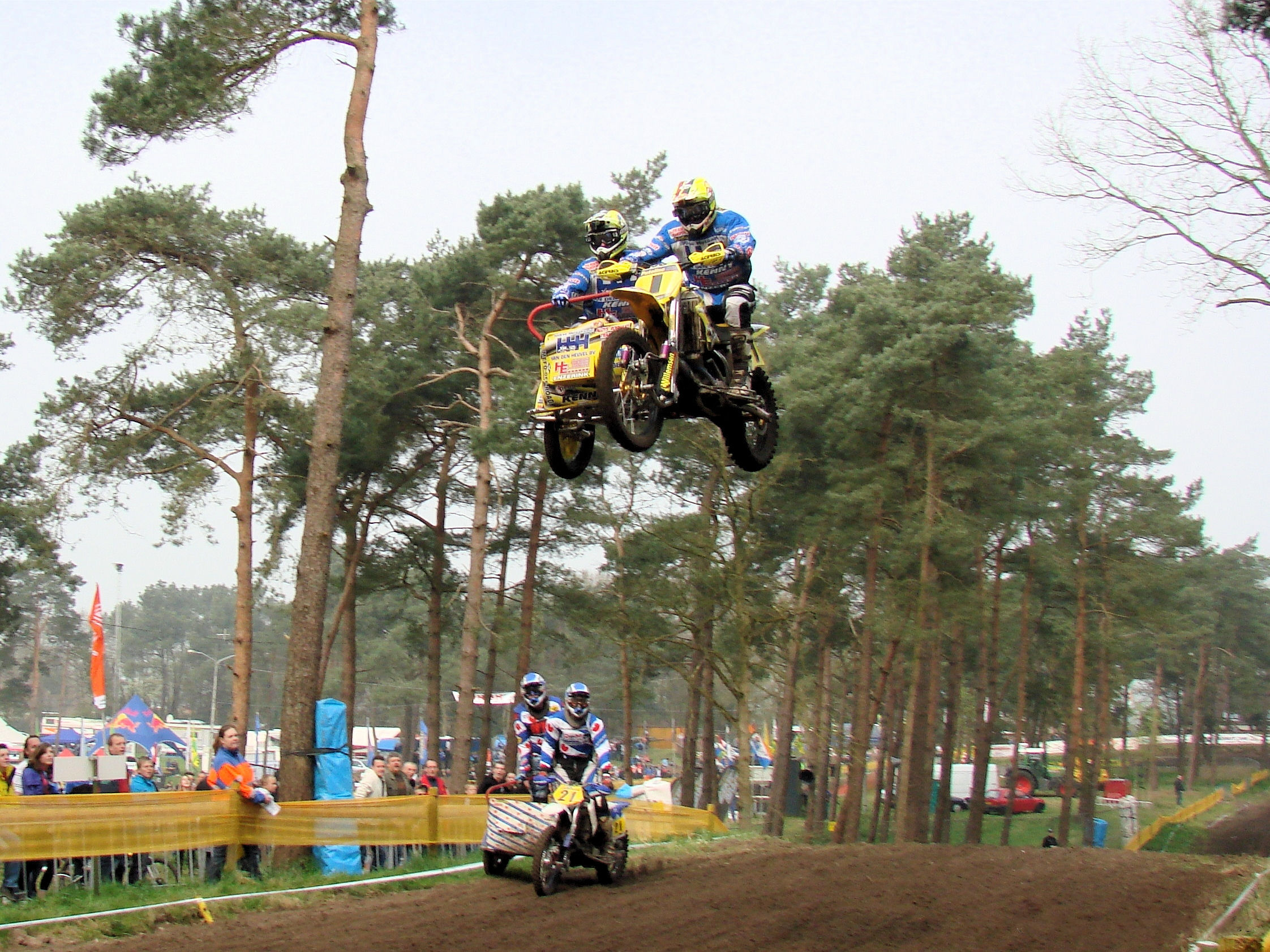
Ten time World Champion Daniël Willemsen in action in 2009.

Every Grand Prix weekend was split into two races, both held on the same day. This meant that the 2015 season, with its fifteen Grands Prix had 30 races. Each race lasted for 30 minutes plus two laps. The points scored over the races were combined to determine an overall winner. In case of a tie, the results of the second race were used to determine the winner. While this overall winner received no extra world championship points, they usually were awarded a special trophy. Race start times were set at 13:30 and 16:00.

Events typically consisted of a qualifying competition, held in multiple stages on Saturdays of a race weekend while the two race events were typically held on Sundays. One exception to this rule was Easter weekends, when the races were held on Easter Monday. Race weekends could consist of additional motocross or quart support races as well, but the FIM stipulated that the World Championship races have priority. Riders had to be provided with at least one 30 minute free practice season, which was timed. A race could consist of up to 30 starters and the qualifying modus was dependent on the number of entries. Up to 32 entries, it was held in one group split into two sessions of 30 minutes each. Above 32 entries, the starter field was sub-divided into two groups through ballot and the current standings. Each qualifying group could consist of up to 30 racers. Should there be more than 60 entries, a pre-qualifying had to be held. Of the riders in the two groups, the top-twelve directly qualified for the races. The remaining teams then go to a second-chance qualifying, in which the best six advanced. The riders placed seventh and eighth remained in reserve should one of the qualified teams be unable to participate.

The FIM stipulated that all drivers and passengers must be at least 16 years old to compete, with the minimum age of drivers having come down from 18 in previous seasons, but no older than 50. Riders older than 50 had to provide a certificate of medical fitness to be permitted to compete. The driver had the right to exchange his passenger under certain conditions.

The engines permitted in the competition in 2015 were 2-stroke from 350 to 750 cc or 4-stroke up to 1,000 cc.

Starting numbers for the season were awarded according to the previous season's overall finishing position of the driver. Current or former World Champions had however the right to pick any number they wished, except the number one which was reserved for the current World Champion.

The competition was open for motor cycles with two-stroke engines from between 350 and 750cc and four-stroke engines of up to 1,000cc. Each team was permitted the use of two motorcycles with the possibility of changing machines between races.

The FIM did not permit radio communication between riders and their teams. Outside assistance during the race on the course was not permitted unless it was through race marshals in the interest of safety. Limited repairs in the designated repair zone during the race were permitted.

The first twenty teams of each race scored competition points. The point system for the 2015 season was as follows:

| Place | Points |
|---|---|
| 1 | 25 |
| 2 | 22 |
| 3 | 20 |
| 4 | 18 |
| 5 | 16 |
| 6 | 15 |
| 7 | 14 |
| 8 | 13 |
| 9 | 12 |
| 10 | 11 |

| Place | Points |
|---|---|
| 11 | 10 |
| 12 | 9 |
| 13 | 8 |
| 14 | 7 |
| 15 | 6 |
| 16 | 5 |
| 17 | 4 |
| 18 | 3 |
| 19 | 2 |
| 20 | 1 |

== Prize money ==
In 2015 prize money was awarded to all riders scoring points, with €300 going to each race winner, €250 to the runners-up, gradually declining from there, with €50 going to all teams placed 12th to 20th. Additionally, every team qualified for the race plus the two reserve teams received €500 in travel compensation.

== Calendar ==
The calendar for the 2015 season:

| Date | Place | Race winners | GP winner | Source |
|---|---|---|---|---|
| 6 April | (Switzerland) Frauenfeld | (Belgium) Ben Adriaenssen / (Netherlands) Ben van den Bogaart | (Belgium) Ben Adriaenssen / (Netherlands) Ben van den Bogaart | Result |
| 6 April | (Switzerland) Frauenfeld | (France) Valentin Giraud / Nicolas Musset | (Belgium) Ben Adriaenssen / (Netherlands) Ben van den Bogaart | Result |
| 12 April | (France) Castelnau-de-Lévis | (France) Valentin Giraud / Nicolas Musset | (France) Valentin Giraud / Nicolas Musset | Result |
| 12 April | (France) Castelnau-de-Lévis | (Belgium) Ben Adriaenssen / (Netherlands) Ben van den Bogaart | (France) Valentin Giraud / Nicolas Musset | Result |
| 19 April | (Spain) Malpartida de Cáceres | (Netherlands) Etienne Bax / (Latvia) Kaspars Stupelis | (France) Valentin Giraud / Nicolas Musset | Result |
| 19 April | (Spain) Malpartida de Cáceres | (France) Valentin Giraud / Nicolas Musset | (France) Valentin Giraud / Nicolas Musset | Result |
| 17 May | (Germany) Schopfheim | (France) Valentin Giraud / Nicolas Musset | (Netherlands) Etienne Bax / (Latvia) Kaspars Stupelis | Result |
| 17 May | (Germany) Schopfheim | (Netherlands) Etienne Bax / (Latvia) Kaspars Stupelis | (Netherlands) Etienne Bax / (Latvia) Kaspars Stupelis | Result |
| 25 May | (Netherlands) Oldebroek | (Netherlands) Etienne Bax / (Latvia) Kaspars Stupelis | (Netherlands) Etienne Bax / (Latvia) Kaspars Stupelis | Result |
| 25 May | (Netherlands) Oldebroek | (Netherlands) Etienne Bax / (Latvia) Kaspars Stupelis | (Netherlands) Etienne Bax / (Latvia) Kaspars Stupelis | Result |
| 7 June | (Latvia) Stelpe | (Netherlands) Etienne Bax / (Latvia) Kaspars Stupelis | (Netherlands) Etienne Bax / (Latvia) Kaspars Stupelis | Result |
| 7 June | (Latvia) Stelpe | (Netherlands) Etienne Bax / (Latvia) Kaspars Stupelis | (Netherlands) Etienne Bax / (Latvia) Kaspars Stupelis | Result |
| 14 June | (Czech Republic) Kramolín | (Netherlands) Etienne Bax / (Latvia) Kaspars Stupelis | (Netherlands) Etienne Bax / (Latvia) Kaspars Stupelis | Result |
| 14 June | (Czech Republic) Kramolín | (Netherlands) Etienne Bax / (Latvia) Kaspars Stupelis | (Netherlands) Etienne Bax / (Latvia) Kaspars Stupelis | Result |
| 28 June | (Belgium) Genk | (Netherlands) Daniël Willemsen / Robbie Bax | (Netherlands) Daniël Willemsen / Robbie Bax | Result |
| 28 June | (Belgium) Genk | (Netherlands) Etienne Bax / (Latvia) Kaspars Stupelis | (Netherlands) Daniël Willemsen / Robbie Bax | Result |
| 5 July | (France) Iffendic | (Netherlands) Etienne Bax / (Latvia) Kaspars Stupelis | (France) Valentin Giraud / Nicolas Musset | Result |
| 5 July | (France) Iffendic | (France) Valentin Giraud / Nicolas Musset | (France) Valentin Giraud / Nicolas Musset | Result |
| 19 July | (Germany) Strassbessenbach | (Netherlands) Daniël Willemsen / Robbie Bax | (Netherlands) Daniël Willemsen / Robbie Bax | Result |
| 19 July | (Germany) Strassbessenbach | (Netherlands) Daniël Willemsen / Robbie Bax | (Netherlands) Daniël Willemsen / Robbie Bax | Result |
| 2 August | (Estonia) Kiviõli | (Belgium) Jan Hendrickx / (Netherlands) Ben van den Bogaart | (Belgium) Jan Hendrickx / (Netherlands) Ben van den Bogaart | Result |
| 2 August | (Estonia) Kiviõli | (France) Valentin Giraud / Nicolas Musset | (Belgium) Jan Hendrickx / (Netherlands) Ben van den Bogaart | Result |
| 9 August | (Latvia) Ķegums | (Netherlands) Etienne Bax / (Latvia) Kaspars Stupelis | (Netherlands) Etienne Bax / (Latvia) Kaspars Stupelis | Result |
| 9 August | (Latvia) Ķegums | (Netherlands) Etienne Bax / (Latvia) Kaspars Stupelis | (Netherlands) Etienne Bax / (Latvia) Kaspars Stupelis | Result |
| 30 August | (Switzerland) Roggenburg | (Netherlands) Etienne Bax / (Latvia) Kaspars Stupelis | (Netherlands) Etienne Bax / (Latvia) Kaspars Stupelis | Result |
| 30 August | (Switzerland) Roggenburg | (Netherlands) Etienne Bax / (Latvia) Kaspars Stupelis | (Netherlands) Etienne Bax / (Latvia) Kaspars Stupelis | Result |
| 13 September | (France) Saint-Jean-d'Angély | (Netherlands) Daniël Willemsen / Robbie Bax | (Netherlands) Etienne Bax / (Latvia) Kaspars Stupelis | Result |
| 13 September | (France) Saint-Jean-d'Angély | (Netherlands) Etienne Bax / (Latvia) Kaspars Stupelis | (Netherlands) Etienne Bax / (Latvia) Kaspars Stupelis | Result |
| 20 September | (Germany) Rudersberg | (Netherlands) Etienne Bax / (Latvia) Kaspars Stupelis | (Netherlands) Etienne Bax / (Latvia) Kaspars Stupelis | Result |
| 20 September | (Germany) Rudersberg | (France) Valentin Giraud / (Latvia) Elvijs Mucenieks | (Netherlands) Etienne Bax / (Latvia) Kaspars Stupelis | Result |
| 11 October | (Germany) Schwedt | (Netherlands) Netherlands; Etienne Bax / Kaspars Stupelis; Daniël Willemsen / Peter Beunk; Koen Hermans / Kenny van Gaalen | | Result |

- The Sidecarcross des Nations was a non-championship event, but part of the 2015 calendar and is denoted by a light blue background in the table.

== Classification ==
The top ten teams in the final standings:

| Position | Driver / Passenger | Equipment | Bike No. | Points |
|---|---|---|---|---|
| 1 | (Netherlands) Etienne Bax / (Latvia) Kaspars Stupelis | Zabel-WSP | 2 | 675 |
| 2 | (France) Valentin Giraud / Nicolas Musset (Note: Valentin Giraud raced with Nicolas Musset as his passenger in the first twelve Grands Prix of the season. Following the injury to Musset, Latvia's Elvijs Mucenieks moved across from partnering Belgium's Kristof Santermans, to partner Giraud for the remainder of the season.) | KTM-WHT | 5 | 579 |
| 3 | (Belgium) Jan Hendrickx / (Netherlands) Ben van den Bogaart (Note: Jan Hendrickx raced with Latvia's Elvijs Mucenieks as his passenger in the first six Grands Prix of the season. Following the injury to Ben Adriaenssen, Ben van den Bogaart moved across to partner Hendrickx thereafter.) | Husqvarna-WSP | 4 | 579 |
| 4 | (Netherlands) Daniël Willemsen / Robbie Bax | Zabel-WSP | 111 | 505 |
| 5 | (United Kingdom) Stuart Brown / Josh Chamberlain | Zabel-WSP | 3 | 468 |
| 6 | (Netherlands) Koen Hermans / Kenny van Gaalen | Zabel-WSP | 15 | 368 |
| 7 | (Belgium) Marvin Vanluchene / Eduard Soenens (Note: Marvin Vanluchene raced with Gianni Dhondt as his passenger in the first Grand Prix of the season. Eduard Soenens joined Vanluchene for the second Grand Prix onwards.) | Zabel-WSP | 19 | 352 |
| 8 | (Switzerland) Andy Bürgler / Martin Betschart | KTM-VMC | 16 | 350 |
| 9 | (Czech Republic) Václav Rozehnal / Marek Rozehnal | Zabel-VMC | 8 | 300 |
| 10 | (Netherlands) Gert van Werven / Peter Beunk | Zabel-WSP | 12 | 279 |
