= 2019 Sidecarcross World Championship =

Sidecar racing series

Season
- Grands Prix: 14
- Duration: 7 April 2019–15 September 2019

Drivers
- Champions: (Netherlands) Etienne Bax (Latvia) Kaspars Stupelis

The 2019 FIM Sidecarcross World Championship, the 40th edition of the competition.

== Calendar ==
The Grand Prix calendar for the 2019 season:

GP	Date	Location	Race Winners	Grand Prix Winner	Source
1	7 April	(Belgium) Lommel	(Netherlands) Julian Veldman/ (Belgium) Glenn Janssens	(Belgium) Marvin Vanluchene / (Netherlands) Ben van den Bogaart	Result
1	7 April	(Belgium) Lommel	(Netherlands) Etienne Bax / (Latvia) Kaspars Stupelis	(Belgium) Marvin Vanluchene / (Netherlands) Ben van den Bogaart	Result
2	14 April	(Spain) Talavera de la Reina	(France) Valentin Giraud / (Germany) Andres Haller	(Netherlands) Koen Hermans / (France) Nicolas Musset	Result
2	14 April	(Spain) Talavera de la Reina	(Netherlands) Koen Hermans / (France) Nicolas Musset	(Netherlands) Koen Hermans / (France) Nicolas Musset	Result
3	22 April	(Netherlands) Oldebroek	(Netherlands) Etienne Bax / (Latvia) Kaspars Stupelis	(Netherlands) Etienne Bax / (Latvia) Kaspars Stupelis	Result
3	22 April	(Netherlands) Oldebroek	(Netherlands) Etienne Bax / (Latvia) Kaspars Stupelis	(Netherlands) Etienne Bax / (Latvia) Kaspars Stupelis	Result
4	12 May	(Czech Republic) Kramolín	(Belgium) Marvin Vanluchene / (Netherlands) Ben van den Bogaart	(Belgium) Marvin Vanluchene / (Netherlands) Ben van den Bogaart	Result
4	12 May	(Czech Republic) Kramolín	(Netherlands) Koen Hermans / (France) Nicolas Musset	(Belgium) Marvin Vanluchene / (Netherlands) Ben van den Bogaart	Result
5	19 May	(Ukraine) Kyiv	(Netherlands) Etienne Bax / (Latvia) Kaspars Stupelis	(Netherlands) Etienne Bax / (Latvia) Kaspars Stupelis	Result
5	19 May	(Ukraine) Kyiv	(Netherlands) Etienne Bax / (Latvia) Kaspars Stupelis	(Netherlands) Etienne Bax / (Latvia) Kaspars Stupelis	Result
6	2 June	(France) Plomion	(France) Valentin Giraud / (Germany) Andres Haller	(France) Valentin Giraud / (Germany) Andres Haller	Result
6	2 June	(France) Plomion	(Netherlands) Etienne Bax / (Latvia) Kaspars Stupelis	(France) Valentin Giraud / (Germany) Andres Haller	Result
7	9 June	(Estonia) Kiviõli	(Netherlands) Koen Hermans / (France) Nicolas Musset	(Netherlands) Koen Hermans / (France) Nicolas Musset	Result
7	9 June	(Estonia) Kiviõli	(Netherlands) Koen Hermans / (France) Nicolas Musset	(Netherlands) Koen Hermans / (France) Nicolas Musset	Result
8	7 July	(Netherlands) Markelo	(Netherlands) Etienne Bax / (Latvia) Kaspars Stupelis	(Netherlands) Etienne Bax / (Latvia) Kaspars Stupelis	Result
8	7 July	(Netherlands) Markelo	(Netherlands) Etienne Bax / (Latvia) Kaspars Stupelis	(Netherlands) Etienne Bax / (Latvia) Kaspars Stupelis	Result
9	14 July	(Germany) Bessenbach	(Netherlands) Etienne Bax / (Latvia) Kaspars Stupelis	(Netherlands) Etienne Bax / (Latvia) Kaspars Stupelis	Result
9	14 July	(Germany) Bessenbach	(Netherlands) Etienne Bax / (Latvia) Kaspars Stupelis	(Netherlands) Etienne Bax / (Latvia) Kaspars Stupelis	Result
10	28 July	(Latvia) Stelpe	(Belgium) Arne Dierckens / (Netherlands) Robbie Bax	(Belgium) Arne Dierckens / (Netherlands) Robbie Bax	Result
10	28 July	(Latvia) Stelpe	(Netherlands) Etienne Bax / (Latvia) Kaspars Stupelis	(Belgium) Arne Dierckens / (Netherlands) Robbie Bax	Result
11	25 August	(Switzerland) Roggenburg	(Netherlands) Etienne Bax / (Latvia) Kaspars Stupelis	(Netherlands) Etienne Bax / (Latvia) Kaspars Stupelis	Result
11	25 August	(Switzerland) Roggenburg	(Netherlands) Etienne Bax / (Latvia) Kaspars Stupelis	(Netherlands) Etienne Bax / (Latvia) Kaspars Stupelis	Result
12	1 September	(Belgium) Gooik	(Belgium) Marvin Vanluchene / (Netherlands) Ben van den Bogaart	(Belgium) Marvin Vanluchene / (Netherlands) Ben van den Bogaart	Result
12	1 September	(Belgium) Gooik	(Belgium) Marvin Vanluchene / (Netherlands) Ben van den Bogaart	(Belgium) Marvin Vanluchene / (Netherlands) Ben van den Bogaart	Result
13	8 September	(France) Geugnon	(Netherlands) Etienne Bax / (Latvia) Kaspars Stupelis	(Belgium) Marvin Vanluchene / (Netherlands) Ben van den Bogaart	Result
13	8 September	(France) Geugnon	(Belgium) Marvin Vanluchene / (Netherlands) Ben van den Bogaart	(Belgium) Marvin Vanluchene / (Netherlands) Ben van den Bogaart	Result
14	15 September	(Germany) Rudersberg	(United Kingdom) Stuart Brown / (United Kingdom) Josh Chamberlain	(United Kingdom) Stuart Brown / (United Kingdom) Josh Chamberlain	Result
14	15 September	(Germany) Rudersberg	(United Kingdom) Stuart Brown / (United Kingdom) Josh Chamberlain	(United Kingdom) Stuart Brown / (United Kingdom) Josh Chamberlain	Result

== Final standings ==
The top ten teams in the final standings:

Position	Driver / Passenger	Equipment	Bike No.	Points
1	(Netherlands) Etienne Bax / (Latvia) Kaspars Stupelis	Zabel-WSP	82	604
2	(Belgium) Marvin Vanluchene / (Netherlands) Ben van den Bogaart	Zabel-VMC	1	548
3	(Netherlands) Koen Hermans / (France) Nicolas Musset	Zabel-WSP	2	447
4	(United Kingdom) Stuart Brown / (United Kingdom) Josh Chamberlain	Husqvarna-WHT	888	421
5	(Belgium) Arne Dierckens / (Netherlands) Robbie Bax	Zabel-WSP	10	406
6	(Estonia) Kert Varik / (Latvia) Lauris Daiders	Husqvarna-WSP	7	331
7	(Italy) Zeno Compalati / (France) Bastien Chopin	Zabel-VMC	18	295
8	(United Kingdom) Jake Brown / (United Kingdom) Joe Millard	Zabel-WSP	28	294
9	(Belgium) Davy Sanders / (Finland) Lari Kunnas	Zabel-WSP	9	252
10	(Belgium) Kristof Santermans / (Latvia) Konstantinas Beleckas	Zabel-WSP	16	203
