= 2013 Sidecarcross World Championship =

Motorcycle race in 2013

Season
- Grands Prix: 14
- Duration: 1 April 2013–22 September 2013

Drivers
- Champions: (Belgium) Ben Adriaenssen (Netherlands) Ben van den Bogaart
- Sidecarcross des Nations: not held

The 2013 FIM Sidecarcross World Championship, the 34th edition of the competition, started on 1 April and finished after fourteen race weekends on 22 September 2013.

The defending champions were Daniël Willemsen from the Netherlands and his passenger Kenny van Gaalen. However, Willemsen competed with two different passengers in 2013, Robbie Bax and Belgian Dagwin Sabbe, but missed most of the season through injuries. The 2013 World Championship was won by Belgian driver Ben Adriaenssen and his Dutch passenger Ben van den Bogaart. It was the first title for both of them.

All up, 56 teams were qualified overall, from the World Champions in first spot with 610 points to the 56th placed Lithuanian team of Vytautas and Andžejus Racka on one point. The Dutch-Latvian combination of Etienne Bax and Kaspars Stupelis finished runners-up in the overall standings for the second year in a row while defending champion Daniël Willemsen finished only 21st. Ben Adriaenssen and Ben van den Bogaart won eleven races and seven Grand Prix in the 2013 season, followed by Etienne Bax and Kaspars Stupelis with fourteen race wins and six Grand Prix. Of the other teams, only Jan Hendrickx with Elvijs Mucenieks won a Grand Prix. Hendrickx/Mucenieks also won one race during the season, while the French team of Valentin Giraud and Nicolas Musset won the remaining two.

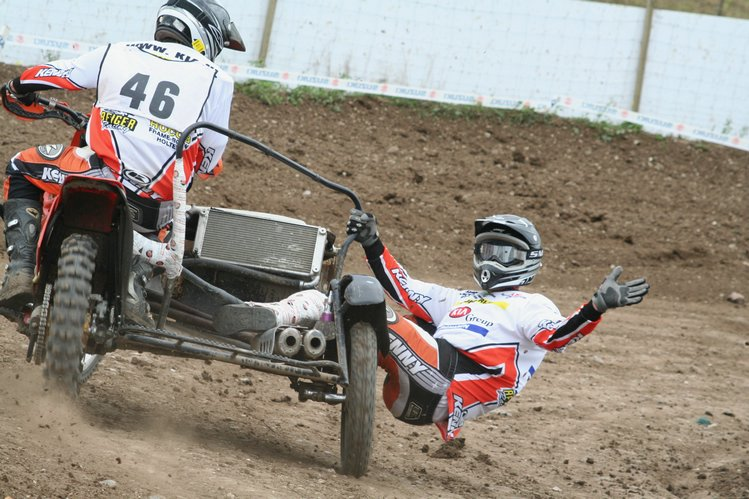
Sidecarcross passenger in action

The Sidecarcross World Championship, first held in 1980 and organised by the Fédération Internationale de Motocyclisme, is an annual competition. All races, manufacturers and the vast majority of riders in the competition being in and from Europe. Sidecarcross is similar to motocross except that the teams consist of two riders, a driver and a passenger. Races are held on the same tracks as solo motocross but the handling of the machines differs as sidecars don't lean. The majority of physical work in the sport is carried out by the passenger, who speeds up the sidecarcross in corners by leaning out. The coordination between the driver and the passenger are therefore of highest importance.

== Overview ==
The fourteen Grand Prix of the season were held in nine countries, Switzerland (two GP's), Ukraine, Germany (three GP's), Czech Republic, Netherlands, Belgium (two GP's), France (two GP's), Estonia and Latvia. In comparison to the 2012 edition, the Grand Prix of Russia was dropped off the calendar while the Ukrainian GP made a return and Switzerland, Belgium and Germany were each awarded an extra GP.

== Format ==
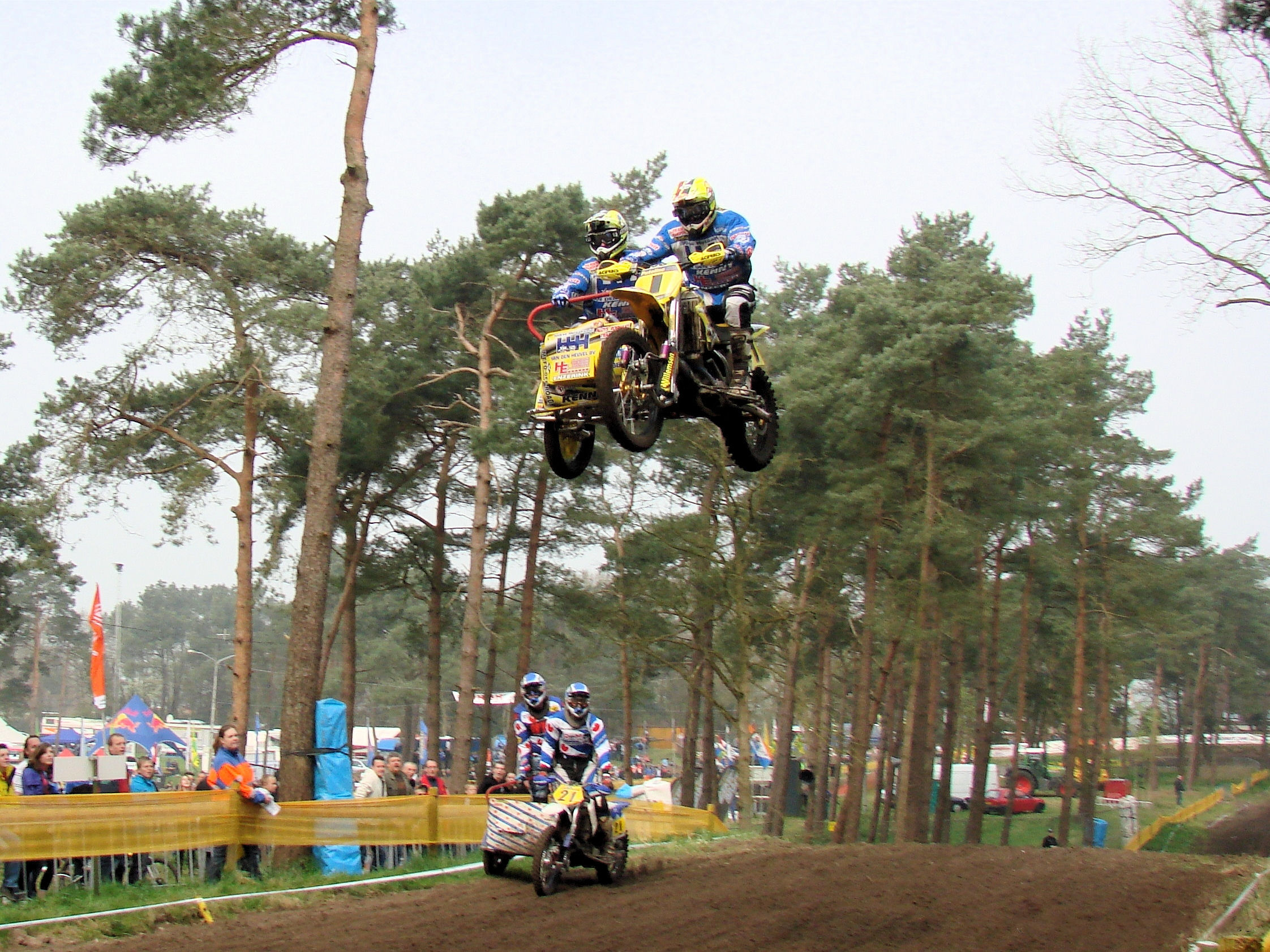
Defending 2012 champion Daniël Willemsen in action in 2009.

Every Grand Prix weekend is split into two races, both held on the same day. This means, the 2013 season with its fourteen Grand Prix had 28 races. Each race lasts for 30 minutes plus two laps. The two races on a weekend actually get combined to determine an overall winner. In case of a tie, the results of the second race as used to determine the winner. While this overall winner receives no extra WC points, they are usually awarded a special trophy. Race start times are set at 13:30 and 16:00.

Events typically consist of a qualifying competition, held in multiple stages on Saturdays of a race weekend, while the two race events are typically held on Sundays. One exception to this rule is Easter weekends, when the races are held on Easter Monday. Race weekends can consist of additional motocross or quart support races as well, but the FIM stipulates that the World Championship races have priority. Riders have to be provided with at least one 30 minute free practice season, which will be timed. A race can consist of up to 30 starters, and the qualifying modus is dependent on the number of entries. Up to 32 entries, it will be held in one group split into two sessions of 30 minutes each. Above 32 entries, the starter field will be subdivided into two groups through ballot and the current standings. Each qualifying group can consist of up to 30 racers. Should there be more than 60 entries, a pre-qualifying has to be held. Of the riders in the two groups, the top-twelve directly qualify for the races. The remaining teams then go to a second-chance qualifying, in which the best six advance. The riders placed seventh and eighth remain in reserve should one of the qualified teams not be able to participate.

The FIM stipulates that all drivers must be of a minimum age of 18 while passengers have to be at least 16 years old to compete, but no older than 50. Riders older than 50 have to provide a certificate of medical fitness to be permitted to compete. The driver has the right to exchange his passenger under certain conditions.

The engines permitted in the competition in 2013 were 2-stroke from 350 to 750 cc or 4-stroke up to 1,000 cc.

Starting numbers for the season are awarded according to the previous seasons overall finishing position of the driver. Current or former World Champions have however the right to pick any number they wish, except the number one which is reserved for the current World Champion.

The competition is open for motorcycles with two-stroke engines from between 350 and 750cc and four-stroke engines of up to 1,000cc. Each team is permitted the use of two motorcycles with the possibility of changing machines between races.

The FIM does not permit radio communication between riders and their teams. Outside assistance during the race on the course is not permitted unless it is through race marshals in the interest of safety. Limited repairs in the designated repair zone during the race are permitted.

The first twenty teams of each race score competition points. The point system for the 2013 season was as follows:

| Place | Points |
|---|---|
| 1 | 25 |
| 2 | 22 |
| 3 | 20 |
| 4 | 18 |
| 5 | 16 |
| 6 | 15 |
| 7 | 14 |
| 8 | 13 |
| 9 | 12 |
| 10 | 11 |

| Place | Points |
|---|---|
| 11 | 10 |
| 12 | 9 |
| 13 | 8 |
| 14 | 7 |
| 15 | 6 |
| 16 | 5 |
| 17 | 4 |
| 18 | 3 |
| 19 | 2 |
| 20 | 1 |

== Prize money ==
In 2013 prize money was awarded to all rider scoring points, with €300 going to each race winner, €250 to the runners-up, gradually declining from there, with €50 going to all teams placed 12th to 20th. Additionally, every team qualified for the race plus the two reserve teams receive €500 in travel compensation.

== Retirements ==
At the end of the 2013 season a number of long-term competitors retired from the competition, the most successful of those being Latvian Maris Rupeiks, active since 1998 with a third place in 2005 as his best result, and Swede Henrik Söderqvist, active since 1997 with a third place in 2001 as his best result.

== Calendar ==
The calendar for the 2013 season:

| Date | Place | Race winners | GP winner | Source |
| 1 April | (Switzerland) Frauenfeld | (Belgium) Ben Adriaenssen / Ben van den Bogaart | (Belgium) Ben Adriaenssen / Ben van den Bogaart | Result |
| 1 April | (Switzerland) Frauenfeld | (Belgium) Ben Adriaenssen / Ben van den Bogaart | (Belgium) Ben Adriaenssen / Ben van den Bogaart | Result |
| 19 May | (Ukraine) Chernivtsi | (France) Valentin Giraud / Nicolas Musset | (Netherlands) Etienne Bax / Kaspars Stupelis | Result |
| 19 May | (Ukraine) Chernivtsi | (Netherlands) Etienne Bax / Kaspars Stupelis | (Netherlands) Etienne Bax / Kaspars Stupelis | Result |
| 26 May | (Germany) Schwedt | (Netherlands) Etienne Bax / Kaspars Stupelis | (Netherlands) Etienne Bax / Kaspars Stupelis | Result |
| 26 May | (Germany) Schwedt | (Netherlands) Etienne Bax / Kaspars Stupelis | (Netherlands) Etienne Bax / Kaspars Stupelis | Result |
| 9 June | (Czech Republic) Kramolín | (Belgium) Ben Adriaenssen / Ben van den Bogaart | (Belgium) Ben Adriaenssen / Ben van den Bogaart | Result |
| 9 June | (Czech Republic) Kramolín | (Belgium) Ben Adriaenssen / Ben van den Bogaart | (Belgium) Ben Adriaenssen / Ben van den Bogaart | Result |
| 16 June | (Netherlands) Varsseveld | (Belgium) Ben Adriaenssen / Ben van den Bogaart | (Belgium) Ben Adriaenssen / Ben van den Bogaart | Result |
| 16 June | (Netherlands) Varsseveld | (Belgium) Ben Adriaenssen / Ben van den Bogaart | (Belgium) Ben Adriaenssen / Ben van den Bogaart | Result |
| 23 June | (Belgium) Genk | (France) Valentin Giraud / Nicolas Musset | (Belgium) Ben Adriaenssen / Ben van de Bogaart | Result |
| 23 June | (Belgium) Genk | (Belgium) Ben Adriaenssen / Ben van den Bogaart | (Belgium) Ben Adriaenssen / Ben van de Bogaart | Result |
| 7 July | (France) Iffendic | (Netherlands) Etienne Bax / Kaspars Stupelis | (Netherlands) Etienne Bax / Kaspars Stupelis | Result |
| 7 July | (France) Iffendic | (Netherlands) Etienne Bax / Kaspars Stupelis | (Netherlands) Etienne Bax / Kaspars Stupelis | Result |
| 21 July | (Germany) Strassbessenbach | (Netherlands) Etienne Bax / Kaspars Stupelis | (Belgium) Ben Adriaenssen / Ben van den Bogaart | Result |
| 21 July | (Germany) Strassbessenbach | (Belgium) Ben Adriaenssen / Ben van den Bogaart | (Belgium) Ben Adriaenssen / Ben van den Bogaart | Result |
| 4 August | (Estonia) Kiviõli | (Netherlands) Etienne Bax / Kaspars Stupelis | (Netherlands) Etienne Bax / Kaspars Stupelis | Result |
| 4 August | (Estonia) Kiviõli | (Netherlands) Etienne Bax / Kaspars Stupelis | (Netherlands) Etienne Bax / Kaspars Stupelis | Result |
| 11 August | (Latvia) Ķegums | (Netherlands) Etienne Bax / Kaspars Stupelis | (Netherlands) Etienne Bax / Kaspars Stupelis | Result |
| 11 August | (Latvia) Ķegums | (Netherlands) Etienne Bax / Kaspars Stupelis | (Netherlands) Etienne Bax / Kaspars Stupelis | Result |
| 18 August | (Switzerland) Roggenburg | (Netherlands) Etienne Bax / Kaspars Stupelis | (Belgium) Ben Adriaenssen / Ben van den Bogaart | Result |
| 18 August | (Switzerland) Roggenburg | (Belgium) Ben Adriaenssen / Ben van den Bogaart | (Belgium) Ben Adriaenssen / Ben van den Bogaart | Result |
| 8 September | (France) Dardon Guegnon | (Netherlands) Etienne Bax / Kaspars Stupelis | (Belgium) Ben Adriaenssen / Ben van den Bogaart | Result |
| 8 September | (France) Dardon Guegnon | (Belgium) Ben Adriaenssen / Ben van den Bogaart | (Belgium) Ben Adriaenssen / Ben van den Bogaart | Result |
| 15 September | (Germany) Rudersberg | (Belgium) Ben Adriaenssen / Ben van den Bogaart | (Belgium) Jan Hendrickx / Elvijs Mucenieks | Result |
| 15 September | (Germany) Rudersberg | (Belgium) Jan Hendrickx / Elvijs Mucenieks | (Belgium) Jan Hendrickx / Elvijs Mucenieks | Result |
| 22 September | (Belgium) Nismes | (Netherlands) Etienne Bax / Kaspars Stupelis | (Netherlands) Etienne Bax / Kaspars Stupelis | Result |
| 22 September | (Belgium) Nismes | (Netherlands) Etienne Bax / Kaspars Stupelis | (Netherlands) Etienne Bax / Kaspars Stupelis | Result |
| 13 October | (Italy) Cingoli | not held | | |

- The Sidecarcross des Nations is a non-championship event but part of the calendar and is denoted by a light blue background in the table above. The 2013 event was cancelled after the fatal accident of 19-year-old British rider Connor Smith in the quad support race.
- Flags for passengers not shown.

== Classification ==
=== Riders ===
The top ten teams in the final standings were:

| Position | Driver / Passenger | Equipment | Bike No | Points |
| 1 | (Belgium) Ben Adriaenssen / (Netherlands) Ben van den Bogaart | KTM-WSP | 3 | 610 |
| 2 | (Netherlands) Etienne Bax / (Latvia) Kaspars Stupelis | Zabel-VMC | 2 | 513 |
| 3 | (Belgium) Jan Hendrickx / (Latvia) Elvijs Mucenieks | Zabel-WSP | 5 | 442 |
| 4 | (Latvia) Janis Daiders / Lauris Daiders | Zabel-WSP | 11 | 442 |
| 5 | (Czech Republic) Václav Rozehnal / Marek Rozehnal | Zabel-VMC | 7 | 376 |
| 6 | (United Kingdom) Stuart Brown / Josh Chamberlain | Zabel-WSP | 111 | 324 |
| 7 | (Latvia) Maris Rupeiks / Haralds Kurpnieks | Zabel-WSP | 9 | 319 |
| 8 | (Switzerland) Andy Bürgler / Martin Betschart | KTM-VMC | 10 | 316 |
| 9 | (Sweden) Philip Stenborg / Christian Nilsson | Zabel-VMC | 19 | 257 |
| 10 | (Belgium) Jason van Daele / Tim Smeuninx | Zabel-VMC | 12 | 256 |

- The Sidecarcross World Championship standings remain provisional pending the decision of the FIM International Disciplinary Court in the case of passenger Lauris Daiders who has been provisionally suspended by the FIM following a failed doping test.

=== Manufacturers ===
Parallel to the riders championship, a manufacturers competition was also held. In every race, only the best-placed rider of every make was awarded points in this competition.

The final standings in the manufacturers competition were:

| Position | Manufacturer | Points |
| 1 | WSP | 648 |
| 2 | VMC | 612 |
| 3 | WHT | 359 |
| 4 | AYR | 34 |
