= 2017 Sidecarcross World Championship =

World Championship

Season
- Grands Prix: 14
- Duration: –

Drivers
- Champions: (Netherlands) Etienne Bax (France) Nicolas Musset

The 2017 FIM Sidecarcross World Championship, the 38th edition of the competition.

== Final standings ==
The top ten teams in the final standings:

Position	Driver / Passenger	Equipment	Bike No.	Points
1	(Netherlands) Etienne Bax / (France) Nicolas Musset	Zabel-WSP	82	567
2	(France) Valentin Giraud / (Latvia) Elvijs Mucenieks	Husqvarna-WHT	9	533
3	(Netherlands) Daniël Willemsen / (Netherlands) Robbie Bax	Zabel-WSP	111	526
4	(United Kingdom) Stuart Brown / (United Kingdom) Josh Chamberlain	Zabel-WSP	3	395
5	(Netherlands) Koen Hermans / (Netherlands) Kenny van Gaalen	Zabel-VMC	8	391
6	(Latvia) Janis Daiders/ (Latvia) Kaspars Stupelis	Zabel-VMC	75	387
7	(Czech Republic) Tomas Cermak / (Czech Republic) Ondrej Cermak	MEGA-WSP	5	375
8	(United Kingdom) Brett Wilkinson / (United Kingdom) Dan Chamberlain	MEGA-WSP	7	322
9	(Belgium) Marvin Vanluchene / (Latvia) Haralds Kurpnieks	Zabel-VMC	11	314
10	(Netherlands) Julian Veldman / (Netherlands) Ben van den Bogaart	Husqvarna-WSP	31	296
