= Etienne Bax =

Dutch sidecarcross rider

- Nationality: Netherlands
- Born: August 9, 1988 (age 38)
- Current team: Etienne Bax & Kaspars Stupelis
- Bike number: 82
- Website: Team Bax official website
Motorcycle racing career statistics
Sidecarcross World Championship
Active years	2007 - Present
Manufacturers	Zabel-VMC (2007–2009) Zabel-EML (2010) Zabel-VMC (2011) Zabel-WSP (2012) Zabel-VMC (2013) Zabel-WSP (2014–2015) Yamaha-WSP (2016) Zabel-WSP (2016–2019)
Championships	(2) 2015, 2017
2015 championship position	1st
Starts / Wins / Podiums / Poles / F. laps / Points; 177 / 53 / 101 / / / 3,432

Etienne Bax (born 9 August 1988) is a Dutch sidecarcross rider and the 2015, 2017, 2019 and 2021 World Champion. He also became a three-time runner-up, having come second overall in 2012, 2013 and 2014.

Bax has also won the Dutch national championship on five occasions, in 2010, 2011, 2012, 2014 and 2015.

== Racing career ==
=== Dutch National Championship ===
Racing from an early age, Bax first took part in the Dutch amateur championship which he won in 2004. From 2007, he entered the Dutch national championship, coming fourth in its first season there. Bax repeated this result in 2008 and 2009 before taking out three consecutive national titles from 2010 to 2012, the first two with Ben van den Bogaart as his passenger, the third with Kaspars Stupelis. After another fourth place in 2013, Bax won his fourth national title in 2014, again with Stupelis as his passenger and repeated this result in 2015.

=== Sidecarcross World Championship ===
Bax made his debut in the World Championship in 2007 with passenger Marc van Deutekom at his side, coming 21st overall with a twelfth place in Plomion as their best race result. The pair was more successful in 2008, finishing tenth in the WC and achieving a podium finish when they came third in the second race of the German Grand Prix in Strassbessenbach. Bax raced for a third season with van Deutekom in 2009, now finishing eighth in the WC.

In 2010 and 2011, Bax raced with Ben van den Bogaart as his passenger with the new combination finishing fourth in the WC and taking out two race wins and winning the final two Grand Prix of the season in Rudersberg, Germany. In 2011, Bax and van den Bogaart came fifth in the WC, achieved three race and one Grand Prix win.

From 2012 onwards, Bax raced with Latvian passenger Kaspars Stupelis, a former double World Champion in the sport. In their first season together the pair came second in the WC, finishing only five points behind eventual winner Daniël Willemsen. The team took out nine race wins and won five Grand Prix that season. Bax and Stupelis came second once more in 2013, now to Belgian driver Ben Adriaenssen who raced with Ben van den Bogaart but despite 15 race and six Grand Prix wins Bax finished almost 100 points behind the World Champions. Bax had suffered an internal injury just before the start of the season and required surgery, missing the opening Grand Prix of the season in the process.

Bax came second in the WC for a third consecutive time in 2014, finishing 18 points behind Adriaenssen. Bax and Stupelis won eight races that season and five Grand Prix and dominated the final three events of the year, but having the last race of the season, in Rudersberg, cancelled because of bad weather. Bax had entered the last Grand Prix of the season 28 points behind the leaders and made up ten points in the first race but missed out on a chance to still win the Championship when the second race was cancelled.

Bax, with Stupelis as his passenger once more, won the 2015 Sidecarcross World Championship, taking out the title in the second-last event of the season. In October 2015 it was announced that Bax would race with his younger brother Robbie as passenger instead of Stupelis in 2016 and that the team would switch to Yamaha engines. Lack of engine performance forced Bax to switch back, with the approval from Yamaha, from a four-stroke Yamaha to a two-stroke Zabel engine in an attempt to achieve better results and podium finishes.

== Personal life ==
Bax is the older brother of Robbie Bax (born 18 October 1991) who himself is active in the Sidecarcross World Championship as a passenger and who raced with Etienne in the early days of their careers.

Bax used to be a roofer by profession before he turned full professional in 2015 and lives in Bergeijk, North Brabant. He is married and has a daughter (born in 2014) and a son (born in 2018)

== Season by season ==
=== World Championship ===
The season by season results in the World Championship for Etienne Bax:

Season	Passenger	Equipment	Position	Points	Races	Wins	Second	Third
2007	Marc van Deutekom	Zabel-VMC	21	52	14	—	—	—
2008	Marc van Deutekom	Zabel-VMC	10	240	24	—	—	1
2009	Marc van Deutekom	Zabel-VMC	8	300	22	—	1	—
2010	Ben van den Bogaart	Zabel-EML	4	456	28	2	5	2
2011	Ben van den Bogaart	Zabel-VMC	5	347	23	3	3	4
2012	Kaspars Stupelis	Zabel-WSP	2	447	22	9	8	1
2013	Kaspars Stupelis	Zabel-VMC	2	513	25	15	6	—
2014	Kaspars Stupelis	Zabel-WSP	2	402	19	8	5	3
2015	Kaspars Stupelis	Zabel-WSP	1	675	30	16	7	3
2016	Robbie Bax	Yamaha-WSP Zabel-WSP						
Overall 2007 – 2015				3,432	207	53	34	14

=== Championships overview ===
	2007	2008	2009	2010	2011	2012	2013	2014	2015
World Championship	21	10	8	4	5	2	2	2	1
Dutch National Championship	4	4	4	1	1	1	4	1	1

=== Key ===
1	Champions
2	Runners-up
3	Third placed
4 – 10	Driver finished fourth to tenth

== Honours ==
- Sidecarcross World Championship
  - Winner: (2) 2015, 2017
  - Runners-up: (3) 2012–2014
- Dutch National Sidecarcross Championship
  - Winners: (4) 2010–2012, 2014, 2015

Sporting positions
Preceded by Ben Adriaenssen	Sidecarcross World Champion; 2015	Incumbent
Preceded by Peter Steegmans	Dutch national sidecarcross champion 2010–2012	Succeeded by Marcel Grondman
Preceded by Marcel Grondman	Dutch national sidecarcross champion 2014–present	Incumbent
