= Kenny van Gaalen =

Dutch sidecarcross rider

- Nationality: Netherlands
- Born: January 29, 1988 (age 38) 's-Hertogenbosch, Netherlands
- Bike number: 6
Motorcycle racing career statistics
Sidecarcross World Championship
Active years	2009-2012, 2014-present
Manufacturers	KTM-VMC (2009-2010) Zabel-VMC (2011) Zabel-WSP (2012, 2014–present)
Championships	(1) 2012
2015 championship position	6th
Starts / Wins / Podiums / Poles / F. laps / Points; 98 / 5 / 13 / / / 1,252

Kenny van Gaalen (born 29 January 1988) is a Dutch sidecarcross rider and the 2012 Sidecarcross World Champion, riding as passenger with Daniël Willemsen.

== Biography ==
Van Gaalen began his sidecarcross career as the passenger of Belgian driver Ben Adriaenssen in 2004, racing in the Netherlands in the competition of the Motorsport Organisatie Nederland, a Dutch amateur motorsport organisation

In 2009, the pair moved up to semi-professional level and entered the World Championship, making their debut at the Swiss Grand Prix at Wohlen. They finished the season in 18th place overall with three sixth place finishes as their best race results. In the team's second World Championship campaign, in 2010, Adriaenssen and van Gaalen finished sixth overall, with a second place in the first race of the Danish Grand Prix as their best result.

In 2011, van Gaalen did only race sporadically, at the side of fellow Dutchman Bjorn Roes. In the 2012 edition van Gaalen replaced Haralds Kurpnieks who broke his wrist in the first Grand Prix of the season as Daniël Willemsen's passenger but himself suffered a knee injury in the second French Grand Prix, and being in turn replaced by Lauris Daiders for the last five GP's. Van Gaalen took out the World Championship as a passenger because he earned more than 50 percent of the total points Willemsen took out in the 2012 championship, the necessary requirement for a passenger to become World Champion as per FIM regulations.

In 2013, van Gaalen did not race at World Championship level while his former partner, Ben Adriaenssen, took out the World Championship. He returned for the 2014 season, now as passenger of then 17-year-old Koen Hermans. The pair raced together again in 2015, now coming sixth overall.

== Season by season ==
The season by season results in the world championship for Kenny van Gaalen:

Season	Driver	Equipment	Position	Points	Races	Wins	Second	Third
2009	(Belgium) Ben Adriaenssen	KTM-VMC	18	108	14	—	—	—
2010	(Belgium) Ben Adriaenssen	KTM-VMC	6	322	27	—	1	2
2011	(Netherlands) Bjorn Roes	Zabel-VMC	41	5	4	—	—	—
2012	(Netherlands) Daniël Willemsen	Zabel-WSP	1	249	10	5	4	1
2014	(Netherlands) Koen Hermans	Zabel-WSP	15	100	13	—	—	—
2015	(Netherlands) Koen Hermans	Zabel-WSP	6	368	30	—	—	—
2016	(Netherlands) Koen Hermans	Zabel-WSP						
Overall 2009 – 2015				1,252	98	5	5	3

== Honours ==
=== World Championship ===
- Champions: 2012

Sporting positions
Preceded by Sven Verbrugge	Sidecarcross World Champion (passenger); 2012	Succeeded by Ben van den Bogaart
