= Chris Etheridge =

British sidecarcross rider

- Nationality: British
Motorcycle racing career statistics
Sidecarcross World Championship
Active years	1986 – 2001
Championships	none
2001 championship position	21st
Starts / Wins / Podiums / Poles / F. laps / Points; 123 / 6 / 13 / / / 934

Chris Etheridge is a British retired sidecarcross driver. In the Sidecarcross World Championship, his greatest success has been three top-ten finishes in a career stretching over 16 seasons from 1986 to 2001, while domestically, he has won ten national British Sidecarcross Championships, a record at the time but since broken.

== Racing career ==
=== British Championship ===
Etheridge entered the national British Sidecarcross Championship for the first time in 1985 and would compete at this level for the next eighteen years, racing mostly with Shane Skeats as his passenger in the early seasons. The pair finished eighth overall in 1985 but soon became much more competitive, finishing runners-up in the following five seasons from 1986 to 1990. In this era however, Paul and Mark Millard proved to strong for Etheridge on each occasion, the Millards taking out five consecutive national titles. The closest Etheridge came to finishing above the pair was in 1987 when he finished only thirteen points behind.

With a new passenger, Nick Brace, a new engine make, a Zabel, and the retirement of Paul Millard Etheridge started to dominate the national championship from 1991 onwards, winning six consecutive titles until 1997. The first three seasons were won with a comfortable margin, in 1994 however Etheridge took the title out by only four points. Etheridge had almost missed out because of a broken shoulder the week before the final round but rode despite the injury and against the doctors advice. From 1994, he switched to Garry Withers as his permanent passenger, having utilised him before sporadically.

Etheridge's run of national titles was stopped in 1998 when Peter Clark and John Chambers took out the title and Etheridge came only third. Etheridge, now with Chambers as his passenger, won three more national titles from 1998 onwards. The 1998 one meant he surpassed the previous record of seven national titles held by Terry Good. After his tenth and last championship in 2001, Etheridge retired from the sport domestically and internationally.

Etheridge made a brief return to the competition when he raced in place of his son injured Jack for one event in Wooley Grange in July 2012.

Etheridge's record of ten national titles was surpassed by Stuart Brown in 2013 when the latter won his 11th title.

=== World Championship ===
Etheridge made his debut in the Sidecarcross World Championship at the opening race of the 1986 season, the British Grand Prix, finishing third in his first-ever race and eighteenth overall in the competition. The first seven seasons Etheridge experienced moderate success in the competition, racing sporadically, with a 12th place overall and two podium finishes in races in 1991 as his best result. A more successful era followed from 1993 to 1995 when, racing with Garry Withers as his passenger he finished in the top-ten each season. The 1993 season became his best-ever in the World Championship, finishing seventh overall and taking out three race wins, one in Germany and two at the British Grand Prix in Langrish, thereby winning the later event, the only GP victory in his career.

The 1994 and 1995 seasons were not quite as successful, finishing tenth and ninth overall and winning only one more race, the first race in the first of two French Grand Prix in 1994. From 1996 onwards, his results and number of race participations declined again, Etheridge not finishing in the top-ten again in his final six seasons in the competition. He managed to win two more races, in the Czech Republic in 1996 and in Switzerland in 2000 without achieving any other podium finishes in this time. In his final season, 2001, he finished 21st, one place and point behind fellow British rider Stuart Brown who would succeed Etheridge as the most outstanding British rider of his period domestically and internationally from then on.

== Private life ==
Etheridge hails from Staplehurst, near Maidstone in Kent. His son Jack is also a sidecarcross rider and active in both the British and World Championship.

== Season by season ==
The season by season results in the World Championship for Chris Etheridge:

Season	Passenger	Equipment	Position	Points	Races	Wins	Second	Third
1986	Shane Skeats	Maico-EML	18	47	5	—	—	1
1987	Shane Skeats	Maico-EML	28	14	3	—	—	—
1988	Shane Skeats	Kawasaki-WASP	24	31	5	—	—	—
1989	Ray Eltham	Kawasaki-WASP	55	1	1	—	—	—
1990	Nick Brace	Kawasaki-WASP	26	21	3	—	—	—
1991	Nick Brace	Zabel-EML	12	58	5	—	1	1
1992	Garry Withers Shane Skeats Nick Brace	Zabel-VMC	18	82	12	—	—	—
1993	Nick Brace Garry Withers	Zabel-EML	7	239	22	3	1	2
1994	Garry Withers	Zabel-VMC	10	108	15	1	—	—
1995	Garry Withers	KTM-BSU	9	106	13	—	1	—
1996	Mike Turner Garry Withers	KTM-BSU	16	52	9	1	—	—
1997	Paul Henderson	KTM-BSU	18	42	8	—	—	—
1998	Garry Withers	Zabel-BSU	37	7	3	—	—	—
1999	Jason Peters John Chambers	Zabel-EML	19	51	9	—	—	—
2000	John Chambers	MTH-BSU	23	33	5	1	—	—
2001	John Chambers	MTH-VMC	21	42	5	—	—	—
Overall 1986 – 2001				934	123	6	3	4

=== Key ===
1	World Champions
2	Runners-up
3	Third placed
4 – 10	Driver finished fourth to tenth

== Honours ==
- British National Sidecarcross Championship
  - Winners: (10) 1991–1997, 1999–2001
  - Runners-up: (5) 1986–1991

Sporting positions
Preceded by Paul Millard	British national sidecarcross champion 1991–1997	Succeeded by Peter Clark
Preceded by Peter Clark	British national sidecarcross champion 1999–2001	Succeeded by Stuart Brown
