= Ben van den Bogaart =

Dutch sidecarcross rider

- Nationality: Netherlands
- Born: September 24, 1989 (age 37)
- Bike number: 3
Motorcycle racing career statistics
Sidecarcross World Championship
Active years	2008 - present
Manufacturers	Zabel-WSP (2008–2009) Zabel-EML (2010) Zabel-VMC (2011–2012) KTM-WSP (2012–2013) Husqvarna-WSP (2014–present)
Championships	(2) 2013, 2014
2015 championship position	3rd
Starts / Wins / Podiums / Poles / F. laps / Points; 191 / 26 / 78 / / / 2,792

Ben van den Bogaart (born 24 September 1989) is a Dutch sidecarcross rider and the 2013 and 2014 Sidecarcross World Champion, riding as passenger with Belgian driver Ben Adriaenssen.

With Etienne Bax, who he rode with as passenger in 2010 and 2011, van den Bogaart also took out the Dutch national sidecarcross championship in both years.

== Biography ==
Van den Bogaart made his Sidecarcross World Championship debut in 2008, when he raced with Belgian driver Kristof Santermans, with the pair finishing 19th in the World Championship that season. The pair continued to race together in 2009, now finishing 13th in the competition.

The following two seasons, 2010 and 2011 saw van den Bogaart race with Dutch rider Etienne Bax. The combination won their first-ever race at the second last Grand Prix of the 2010 season, at Slagelse, Denmark, followed by their first Grand Prix win a week later at Rudersberg, Germany. The following season, Bax and van den Bogaart came fifth in the World Championship but won three races during the season as well as the Danish Grand Prix, once more held at Slagelse. In the two seasons with Etienne Bax, the pair also took out the Dutch national championship on each occasion.

Van den Bogaart joint Belgian driver Jason van Daele for the 2012 season but he was not as successful as his passenger as he had been with Bax, only finishing 12th in the World Championship and achieving no podium finishes.

The 2013 season saw van den Bogaart change drivers once more, now riding with the young Belgian Ben Adriaenssen. The new team won the opening Grand Prix of the season at Frauenfeld, Switzerland and went on to win seven of the fourteen season Grand Prix as well as the World Championship, 97 points clear of runners-up Etienne Bax. The team scored in every race of the season, something no other rider achieved in the competition in 2013. The pair clinched the World Championship in the first race of the second last Grand Prix of the season, with the race, held at Rudersberg, heavily affected by bad weather. Apart from the World Championship, Adriaenssen and van den Boogaart also took out the national Belgian championship in 2013.

Van den Bogaart, on the side of Adriaenssen, once again won the World Championship in 2014, once more in the rain affected last Grand Prix of the season at Rudersberg, 18 points ahead of Etienne Bax.

After an injury to Adriaenssen in the fourth Grand Prix of the 2015 season, van den Bogaart missed two events before joining Jan Hendrickx as a passenger from the seventh event onwards. He remained as Hendrickx's passenger in the 2016 season.

== Season by season ==
The season by season results in the world championship for Ben van den Bogaart:

Season	Driver	Equipment	Position	Points	Races	Wins	Second	Third
2008	(Belgium) Kristof Santermans	Zabel-WSP	19	93	21	—	—	—
2009	(Belgium) Kristof Santermans	Zabel-WSP	13	182	24	—	—	—
2010	(Netherlands) Etienne Bax	Zabel-EML	4	456	28	2	5	2
2011	(Netherlands) Etienne Bax	Zabel-VMC	5	347	23	3	3	4
2012	(Belgium) Jason van Daele	Zabel-VMC	12	154	22	—	—	—
2013	(Belgium) Ben Adriaenssen	KTM-WSP	1	610	28	11	10	3
2014	(Belgium) Ben Adriaenssen	Husqvarna-WSP	1	420	19	7	6	4
2015	(Belgium) Ben Adriaenssen	Husqvarna-WSP	14	161	8	2	1	3
2015	(Belgium) Jan Hendrickx	Husqvarna-WSP	3	347	18	1	8	3
2016	(Belgium) Jan Hendrickx	Husqvarna-WSP						
Overall 2008 – 2015				2,792	191	26	33	19

== Honours ==
=== World Championship ===
- Champions: (5) 2013, 2014, 2016, 2018, 2025

=== Belgium ===
- Champions: (2) 2013, 2015

=== Netherlands ===
- Dutch national sidecarcross champion: (2) 2010, 2011

Sporting positions
Preceded by Kenny van Gaalen	Sidecarcross World Champion (passenger); 2013–2014	Succeeded by Kaspars Stupelis
Preceded by Tim Smeuninx	Belgian national sidecarcross champion (passenger); 2013	Succeeded by Elvijs Mucenieks
Preceded by Christian Verhagen	Dutch national sidecarcross champion (passenger); 2011–2012	Succeeded by Kaspars Stupelis
Preceded by Elvijs Mucenieks	Belgian national sidecarcross champion (passenger); 2015	Incumbent
