= Ben Adriaenssen =

Belgian sidecarcross rider

- Nationality: Belgian
- Born: 27 January 1989 (age 37)
- Bike number: 1
- Website: Official website
Motorcycle racing career statistics
Sidecarcross World Championship
Active years	2009 – present
Manufacturers	KTM-VMC (2009–2011) KTM-WSP (2012–2013) Husqvarna-WSP (2014–present)
Championships	(2) 2013, 2014
2015 championship position	14th
Starts / Wins / Podiums / Poles / F. laps / Points; 144 / 23 / 63 / / / 2,352

Ben Adriaenssen (born 27 January 1989) is a Belgian sidecarcross rider and the 2013 and 2014 World Champion, together with his Dutch passenger, Ben van den Bogaart.

In 2013, Adriaenssen also, for the first time, won the Belgian national sidecarcross championship.

== Biography ==
Adriaenssen began his sidecarcross career, with Dutch passenger Kenny van Gaalen by his side, in 2004, racing in the Netherlands in the competition of the Motorsport Organisatie Nederland, a Dutch amateur motorsport organisation. In this organisation's competition the pair finished as champions in 2007 and 2008.

In 2009, Adriaenssen and van Gaalen started competing at professional level, the World Championship as well as the Dutch national championship. In the latter the pair came third in 2009. The combination made their World Championship debut at the Swiss Grand Prix at Wohlen. They finished the season in 18th place overall with three sixth-place finishes as their best race results.

In the team's second World Championship campaign in 2010, Adriaenssen and van Gaalen finished sixth overall, with a second place in the first race of the Danish Grand Prix as their best result.

For 2011, Adriaenssen changed passengers, now racing with Guennady Auvray, and once more finishing sixth overall. With his new passenger he achieved his first ever race win, at the first race of the Latvian Grand Prix in August 2011. In 2012 Adriaenssen raced with veteran passenger Sven Verbrugge at his side, which had won the World Championship in 2011 on the side of Daniël Willemsen. While Willemsen took out the World Championship in 2012 again, with Kenny van Gaalen as his passenger for parts of the season, Adriaenssen and Verbrugge came third in the standings. The combination was not able to win a race that season but came third on six occasions and scored points in every race of the season, never finishing lower than eighth.

The 2013 season saw Adriaenssen once again change passengers, now riding with Ben van den Bogaart. The new team won the opening Grand Prix of the season at Frauenfeld, Switzerland and went on to win seven of the fourteen season Grand Prix as well as the World Championship, 97 points clear of runners-up Etienne Bax. Adriaenssen once more scored in every race of the season, something no other rider achieved in the competition in 2013. The pair clinched the World Championship in the first race of the second last Grand Prix of the season, with the race, held at Rudersberg, Germany, heavily affected by bad weather. Apart from the World Championship, Adriaenssen and van den Boogaart also took out the national Belgian championship.

Adriaenssen and his passenger, Ben van den Bogaart, once again won the World Championship in 2014, once more in the rain affected last Grand Prix of the season at Rudersberg, 18 points ahead of Etienne Bax.

Adriaenssen suffered a foot injury during the fourth Grand Prix of the 2015 season, at the time sitting in second place of the World Championship, and was forced to miss the rest of the season.

== Sidecarcross results ==
=== Season by season ===
Ben Adriaenssen 's sidecarcross world championship statistics:

Season	Passenger	Equipment	Position	Points	Races	GP Wins	Race Wins	Race Podiums	1	2	3	4	5	6	7	8	9	10	11	12	13	14	15
2009	Kenny van Gaalen	KTM-VMC	18	108	14	—	—	—	FRA –	SWI 0–14	POL –	UKR –	NED 6–6	BEL 0–10	GER 6–13	DEN 0–0	LAT –	RUS –	EST –	FRA 11–7	GER 16–13		
2010	Kenny van Gaalen	KTM-VMC	6	322	27	—	—	4	NED 3–3	GBR 9–9	FRA 7–0	ITA 12–14	POL 5–3	UKR 12–7	BEL 0–	GER 7–9	FRA 14–8	EST 0–12	LAT 8–20	RUS 5–5	DEN 7–6	GER 12–11	
2011	Guennady Auvray	KTM-VMC	6	346	26	—	1	6	NED 0–6	FRA 13–7	SWI 6–0	UKR 8–7	FRA 16–9	POL 7–8	BEL 3–0	GER 4–5	LAT 1–2	EST 0–5	RUS 3–4	DEN 3–2	GER 13–4		
2012	Sven Verbrugge	KTM-WSP	3	385	22	—	—	6	FRA 3–4	NED 8–4	GER 6–5	CZE 5–3	BEL 3–3	FRA 6–4	EST 4–4	RUS 5–5	LAT 4–4	SWI 3–4	GER 3–7				
2013	Ben van den Bogaart	KTM-WSP	1	610	28	7	11	24	SWI 1–1	UKR 3–2	GER 4–3	CZE 1–1	NED 1–1	BEL 3–1	FRA 2–7	GER 2–1	EST 2–2	LAT 2–2	SWI 2–1	FRA 2–1	GER 1–13	BEL 6–2	
2014	Ben van den Bogaart	Husqvarna-WSP	1	402	19	4	7	17	NED 2–2	FRA 2–1	CZE 3–1	FRA 4–3	GER 1–1	EST 1–2	LAT 1–1	SWI 3–2	FRA 3–2	GER 6–					
2015	Ben van den Bogaart	Husqvarna-WSP	14	161	8	1	2	6	SWI 1–2	FRA 3–1	ESP 3–4	GER 3–10	NED –	LAT –	CZE –	BEL –	FRA –	GER –	EST –	LAT –	SWI –	FRA –	GER –
Overall 2009 - 2015				2,352	144	12	23	63	Source: FIM														

== Honours ==
=== World Championship ===
- Champions: (2) 2013, 2014

=== Belgium ===
- Champions: (1) 2013

Sporting positions
Preceded by Daniël Willemsen	Sidecarcross World Champion; 2013–2014	Succeeded by Etienne Bax
Preceded by Jan Hendrickx	Belgian national sidecarcross champion 2013	Succeeded by Jan Hendrickx
