= 2011 Sidecarcross World Championship =

Season
- Grands Prix: 13
- Duration: 3 April 2011–11 September 2011

Drivers
- Champions: (Netherlands) Daniël Willemsen (Belgium) Sven Verbrugge
- Sidecarcross des Nations: Belgium

The 2011 FIM Sidecarcross World Championship, the 32nd edition of the competition, started on 3 April and finished after thirteen race weekends on 11 September 2011.

The defending champions were eight time winners Daniël Willemsen from the Netherlands and his passenger Gertie Eggink. In 2011, Willemsen raced with 43-year-old Sven Verbrugge as his passenger, after an injury to first-choice passenger Roman Vasyliaka. Willemsen and Verbrugge were a team for a fifth time in the history of the competition, with the combination winning the 2005 and 2006 titles together. Willemsen temporarily switched to Ondrej Cermak as his passenger for the first of two German GP's because of an injury to Verbrugge. Willemsen and his passenger clinched the World Championship at the second-last race of the season, at Slagelse, Denmark, having a 53-point lead over Latvians Jānis and Lauris Daiders. The Belgian-Latvian combination Joris Hendrickx-Kaspars Liepiņš, the 2009 World Champions and long the main rivals of Willemsen-Verbrugge during the 2011 season, suffered a season-ending injury at the qualifying of the German Grand Prix in July 2011, being able to compete in the race but requiring surgery afterwards.

Parallel to the riders competition, a manufacturers championship was also held. Like in 2010, the competition was a close contest between 2010 champions WSP and eventual winners VMC.

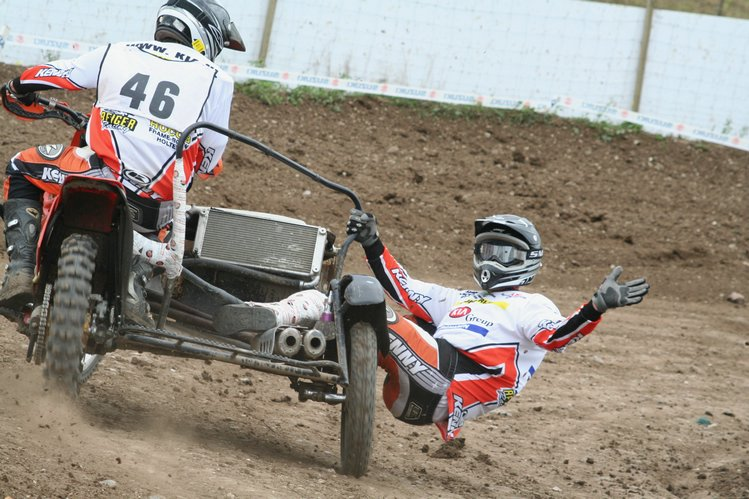
Sidecarcross passenger in action

The Sidecarcross World Championship, first held in 1980 and organised by the Fédération Internationale de Motocyclisme, is an annual competition. All races, manufacturers and the vast majority of riders in the competition being in and from Europe. Sidecarcross is similar to motocross except that the teams consist of two riders, a driver and a passenger. Races are held on the same tracks as solo motocross but the handling of the machines differs as sidecars don't lean. The majority of physical work in the sport is carried out by the passenger, who speeds up the sidecarcross in corners by leaning out. The coordination between the driver and the passenger are therefore of highest importance.

== Overview ==
The thirteen races of the season were held in eleven countries, Netherlands, Switzerland, France, Poland, Ukraine, Belgium, Germany, Estonia, Latvia, Russia and Denmark. In comparison to the 2010 edition, the Grand Prix of Great Britain and Italy have been dropped off the calendar while the Swiss GP made a return.

== Format ==
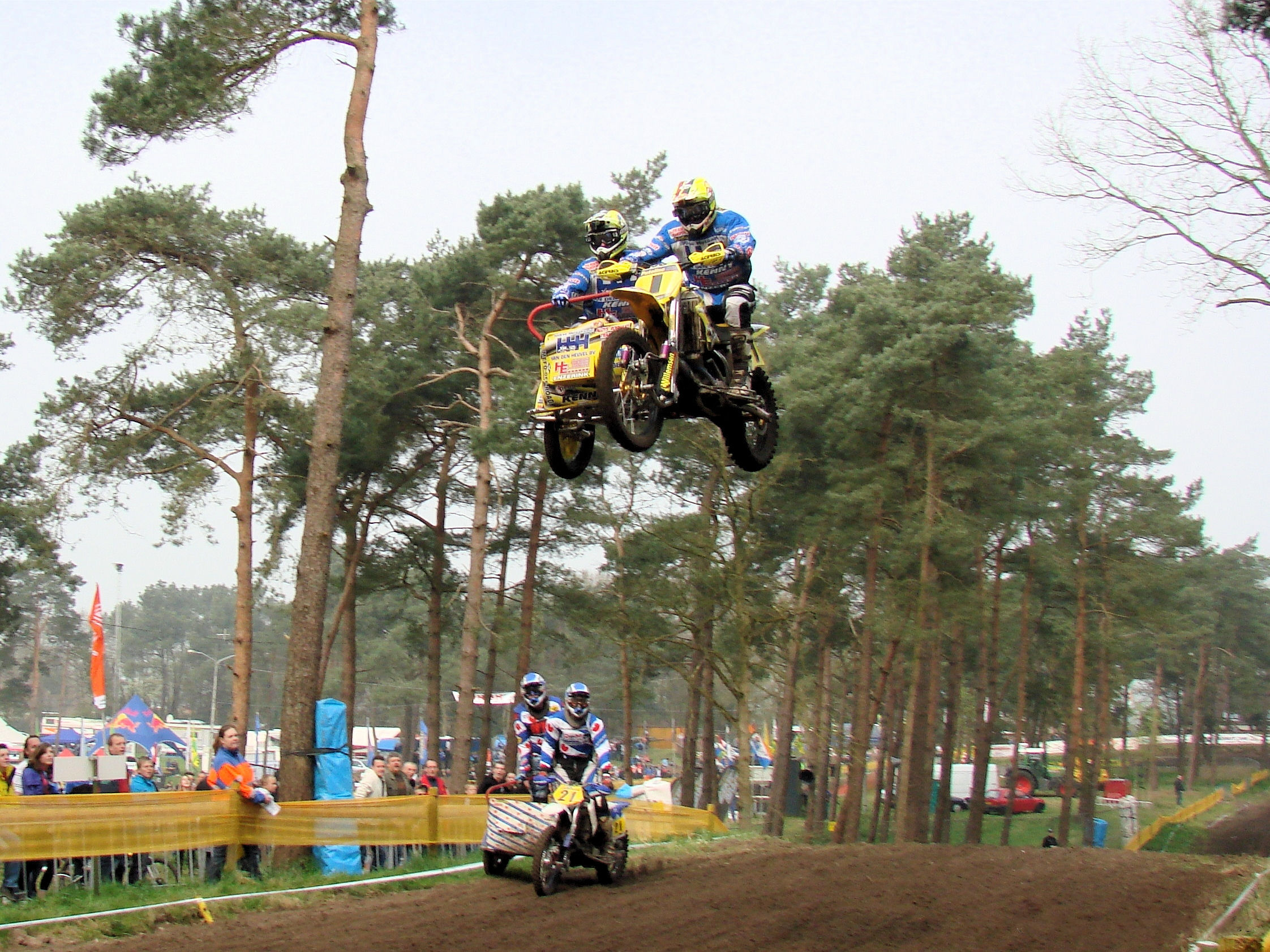
Defending champion and 2011 leader Daniël Willemsen in action in 2009.

Every Grand Prix weekend is split into two races, both held on the same day. This means, the 2011 season with its thirteen Grand Prix has 26 races. Each race lasts for 30 minutes plus two laps. The two races on a weekend actually get combined to determine an overall winner. In case of a tie, the results of the second race as used to determined the winner. While this overall winners receives no extra WC points, they usually are awarded a special trophy. Race start times are set at 13:30 and 16:00.

Events typically consist of a qualifying competition, held in multiple stages on Saturdays of a race weekend while the two race events are typically held on Sundays. One exception to this rule is Easter weekends, when the races are held on Easter Monday. Race weekends can consist of additional motocross or quart support races as well, but the FIM stipulates that the World Championship races have priority. Riders have to be provided with at least one 30 minute free practice season, which will be timed. A race can consist of up to 30 starters and the qualifying modus is dependent on the number of entries. Up to 32 entries, it will be held in one group split into two sessions of 30 minutes each. Above 32 entries, the starter field will be sub-divided into two groups through ballot and the current standings. Each qualifying group can consist of up to 30 racers. Should there be more than 60 entries, a pre-qualifying has to be held. Of the riders in the two groups, the top-twelve directly qualify for the races. The remaining teams then go to a second-chance qualifying, in which the best six advance. The riders placed seventh and eighth remain in reserve should one of the qualified teams not be able to participate.

The FIM stipulates that all drivers must be of a minimum age of 18 while passengers have to be at least 16 years old to compete, but no older than 50. Riders older than 50 have to provide a certificate of medical fitness to be permitted to compete. The driver has the right to exchange his passenger under certain conditions.

Starting numbers for the season are awarded according to the previous seasons overall finishing position of the driver. Current or former World Champions have however the right to pick any number they wish, except the number one which is reserved for the current World Champion.

The competition is open for motor cycles with two-stroke engines from between 350 and 750cc and four-stroke engines of up to 1,000cc. Each team is permitted the use of two motorcycles with the possibility of changing machines between races.

The FIM does not permit radio communication between riders and their teams. Outside assistance during the race on the course is not permitted unless it is through race marshals in the interest of safety. Limited repairs in the designated repair zone during the race are permitted.

The first twenty teams of each race score competition points. The point system for the season was as follows:

Place	Points
1	25
2	22
3	20
4	18
5	16
6	15
7	14
8	13
9	12
10	11

Place	Points
11	10
12	9
13	8
14	7
15	6
16	5
17	4
18	3
19	2
20	1

== Prize money ==
In 2011, prize money was awarded to all rider scoring points, with €300 going to each race winner, €250 to the runners-up, gradually declining from there, with €50 going to all teams placed 12th to 20th. Additionally, every team qualified for the race plus the two reserve teams receive €500 in travel compensation.

== Retirements ==
At the end of the 2011 season a number of long-term competitors retired from the World Championship, the most successful of those being Russian Evgeny Scherbinin, runners-up in 2006 and active since 1999.

== Calendar ==
The calendar for the 2011 season:

Date	Place	Race winners	GP winner	Source
3 April	(Netherlands) Oss	(Belgium) Jan Hendrickx / Tim Smeuninx	(Belgium) Jan Hendrickx / Tim Smeuninx	Result
3 April	(Netherlands) Oss	(Latvia) Janis Daiders / Lauris Daiders	(Belgium) Jan Hendrickx / Tim Smeuninx	Result
17 April	(France) Castelnau	(Netherlands) Daniël Willemsen / Sven Verbrugge	(Netherlands) Daniël Willemsen / Sven Verbrugge	Result
17 April	(France) Castelnau	(Netherlands) Daniël Willemsen / Sven Verbrugge	(Netherlands) Daniël Willemsen / Sven Verbrugge	Result
25 April	(Switzerland) Frauenfeld	(Netherlands) Daniël Willemsen / Sven Verbrugge	(Netherlands) Daniël Willemsen / Sven Verbrugge	Result
25 April	(Switzerland) Frauenfeld	(Netherlands) Daniël Willemsen / Sven Verbrugge	(Netherlands) Daniël Willemsen / Sven Verbrugge	Result
8 May	(Ukraine) Chernivtsi	(Netherlands) Daniël Willemsen / Sven Verbrugge	(Netherlands) Daniël Willemsen / Sven Verbrugge	Result
8 May	(Ukraine) Chernivtsi	(Netherlands) Daniël Willemsen / Sven Verbrugge	(Netherlands) Daniël Willemsen / Sven Verbrugge	Result
13 June	(France) Brou	(Netherlands) Daniël Willemsen / Sven Verbrugge	(Netherlands) Daniël Willemsen / Sven Verbrugge	Result
13 June	(France) Brou	(Belgium) Joris Hendrickx / Kaspars Liepiņš	(Netherlands) Daniël Willemsen / Sven Verbrugge	Result
26 June	(Poland) Gdańsk	(Netherlands) Daniël Willemsen / Sven Verbrugge	(Belgium) Joris Hendrickx / Kaspars Liepins	Result
26 June	(Poland) Gdańsk	(Belgium) Joris Hendrickx / Kaspars Liepins	(Belgium) Joris Hendrickx / Kaspars Liepins	Result
3 July	(Belgium) Genk	(Netherlands) Daniël Willemsen / Sven Verbrugge	(Netherlands) Daniël Willemsen / Sven Verbrugge	Result
3 July	(Belgium) Genk	(Netherlands) Daniël Willemsen / Sven Verbrugge	(Netherlands) Daniël Willemsen / Sven Verbrugge	Result
24 July	(Germany) S'bessenbach	(Netherlands) Daniël Willemsen / Ondrej Cermak	(Netherlands) Daniël Willemsen / Ondrej Cermak	Result
24 July	(Germany) S'bessenbach	(Netherlands) Daniël Willemsen / Ondrej Cermak	(Netherlands) Daniël Willemsen / Ondrej Cermak	Result
7 August	(Latvia) Ķegums	(Belgium) Ben Adriaenssen / Guennady Auvray	(Latvia) Māris Rupeiks / Kaspars Stupelis	Result
7 August	(Latvia) Ķegums	(Latvia) Māris Rupeiks / Kaspars Stupelis	(Latvia) Māris Rupeiks / Kaspars Stupelis	Result
14 August	(Estonia) Kiviõli	(Netherlands) Etienne Bax / Ben van den Bogaart	(Czech Republic) Vaclav Rozehnal / Marek Rozehnal	Result
14 August	(Estonia) Kiviõli	(Czech Republic) Vaclav Rozehnal / Marek Rozehnal	(Czech Republic) Vaclav Rozehnal / Marek Rozehnal	Result
21 August	(Russia) Kamensk	(Netherlands) Daniël Willemsen / Sven Verbrugge	(Netherlands) Daniël Willemsen / Sven Verbrugge	Result
21 August	(Russia) Kamensk	(Netherlands) Daniël Willemsen / Sven Verbrugge	(Netherlands) Daniël Willemsen / Sven Verbrugge	Result
4 September	(Denmark) Slagelse	(Latvia) Jānis Daiders / Lauris Daiders	(Netherlands) Etienne Bax / Ben van den Bogaart	Result
4 September	(Denmark) Slagelse	(Netherlands) Etienne Bax / Ben van den Bogaart	(Netherlands) Etienne Bax / Ben van den Bogaart	Result
11 September	(Germany) Rudersberg	(France) Valentin Giraud / Nicolas Musset	(Latvia) Jānis Daiders / Lauris Daiders	Result
11 September	(Germany) Rudersberg	(Netherlands) Etienne Bax / Ben van den Bogaart	(Latvia) Jānis Daiders / Lauris Daiders	Result
25 September	(Germany) Jauer	Belgium		

- The Sidecarcross des Nations is a non-championship event but part of the calendar and is denoted by a light blue background in the table above.
- Flags for passengers not shown.

== Classification ==
=== Riders ===
The top ten teams in the final overall standings were:

Position	Driver / Passenger	Equipment	Bike No	Points
1	(Netherlands) Daniël Willemsen / (Belgium) Sven Verbrugge ^{1}	Zabel-WSP	1	487
2	(Latvia) Jānis Daiders / Lauris Daiders	Zabel-VMC	8	478
3	(Belgium) Jan Hendrickx / Tim Smeuninx	Zabel-VMC	3	405
4	(Latvia) Māris Rupeiks / Kaspars Stupelis ^{2}	Zabel-WSP	5	349
5	(Netherlands) Etienne Bax / Ben van den Bogaart	Zabel-VMC	4	347
6	(Belgium) Ben Adriaenssen / Guennady Auvray	KTM-VMC	6	346
7	(Russia) Ewgeny Scherbinin / (Latvia) Haralds Kurpnieks	Zabel-WSP	20	321
8	(Germany) Marko Happich / (Switzerland) Meinrad Schelbert	Zabel-VMC	15	317
9	(Belgium) Joris Hendrickx / (Latvia) Kaspars Liepiņš	KTM-VMC	2	315
10	(United Kingdom) Daniel Millard / Joe Millard	Husaberg-WHT	14	268

- Equipment listed is motor and frame.
- ^{1} Used Ondřej Čermák as his passenger in the first German GP.
- ^{2} Used Elvijs Mucenieks as his passenger for the first two GP's of the season.

=== Manufacturers ===
Parallel to the riders championship, a manufacturers competition was also held. In every race, only the best-placed rider of every make was awarded points in this competition.

The final standings in the manufacturers competition were:

Position	Manufacturer	Points
1	VMC	598
2	WSP	563
3	MEFO	184
4	AYR	44
5	KTM	9
6	Bastech KTM	6
7	BSU	2
8	Kawasaki	0
8	Husaberg	0

== 2011 season races ==
=== Oss – Netherlands ===
The top ten of the first Grand Prix of the 2011 season, held on 3 April 2011, at Oss in the Netherlands:

Top Ten Finishers
Pos.	Race 1			Race 2		
	#	Team	Make	#	Team	Make
1	3	(Belgium) Jan Hendrickx / Tim Smeuninx	Zabel-VMC	8	(Latvia) Jānis Daiders / Lauris Daiders	Zabel-VMC
2	10	(Netherlands) Jan Visscher / Jeroen Visscher	Zabel-VMC	1	(Netherlands) Daniël Willemsen / Sven Verbrugge	Zabel-WSP
3	4	(Netherlands) Etienne Bax / Ben van den Bogaart	Zabel-VMC	3	(Belgium) Jan Hendrickx / Tim Smeuninx	Zabel-VMC
4	8	(Latvia) Jānis Daiders / Lauris Daiders	Zabel-VMC	2	(Belgium) Joris Hendrickx / Kaspars Liepins	KTM-VMC
5	2	(Belgium) Joris Hendrickx / Kaspars Liepins	KTM-VMC	10	(Netherlands) Jan Visscher / Jeroen Visscher	Zabel-VMC
6	5	(Latvia) Māris Rupeiks / Elvijs Mucenieks	Zabel-WSP	6	(Belgium) Ben Adriaenssen / Guennady Auvray	KTM-VMC
7	14	(United Kingdom) Daniel Millard / Joe Millard	Husaberg-WHT	17	(Netherlands) Thijs Derks / Robbie Bax	Husaberg-EML
8	20	(Russia) Ewgeny Scherbinin / Haralds Kurpnieks	Zabel-WSP	15	(Germany) Marko Happich / Meinrad Schelbert	Zabel-VMC
9	15	(Germany) Marko Happich / Meinrad Schelbert	Zabel-VMC	20	(Russia) Ewgeny Scherbinin / Haralds Kurpnieks	Zabel-WSP
10	24	(Netherlands) Frank Mulders / Joey van de Venne	MTR-VMC	14	(United Kingdom) Daniel Millard / Joe Millard	Husaberg-WHT

=== Castelnau-de-Lévis – France ===
The top ten of the first of two French Grand Prix in 2011, held on 17 April at Castelnau-de-Lévis:

Top Ten Finishers
Pos.	Race 1			Race 2		
	#	Team	Make	#	Team	Make
1	1	(Netherlands) Daniël Willemsen / Sven Verbrugge	Zabel-WSP	1	(Netherlands) Daniël Willemsen / Sven Verbrugge	Zabel-WSP
2	2	(Belgium) Joris Hendrickx / Kaspars Liepiņš	KTM-VMC	8	(Latvia) Jānis Daiders / Lauris Daiders	Zabel-VMC
3	3	(Belgium) Jan Hendrickx / Tim Smeuninx	Zabel-VMC	3	(Belgium) Jan Hendrickx / Tim Smeuninx	Zabel-VMC
4	8	(Latvia) Jānis Daiders / Lauris Daiders	Zabel-VMC	2	(Belgium) Joris Hendrickx / Kaspars Liepiņš	KTM-VMC
5	4	(Netherlands) Etienne Bax / Ben van den Boogaert	Zabel-VMC	4	(Netherlands) Etienne Bax / Ben van den Boogaert	Zabel-VMC
6	111	(United Kingdom) Stuart Brown / Josh Chamberlain	Husaberg-MEFO	15	(Germany) Marko Happich / Meinrad Schelbert	Zabel-VMC
7	15	(Germany) Marko Happich / Meinrad Schelbert	Zabel-VMC	6	(Belgium) Ben Adriaenssen / Guennady Auvray	KTM-VMC
8	17	(Netherlands) Thijs Derks / Robbie Bax	Husaberg-EML	38	(France) Valentin Giraud / Nicolas Musset	KTM-WHT
9	20	(Russia) Ewgeny Scherbinin / Haralds Kurpnieks	Zabel-WSP	20	(Russia) Ewgeny Scherbinin / Haralds Kurpnieks	Zabel-WSP
10	11	(Czech Republic) Vaclav Rozehnal / Marek Rozehnal	Zabel-VMC	11	(Czech Republic) Vaclav Rozehnal / Marek Rozehnal	Zabel-VMC

=== Frauenfeld – Switzerland ===
The top ten of the Swiss Grand Prix in 2011, held on Easter Monday, 25 April at Frauenfeld:

Top Ten Finishers
Pos.	Race 1			Race 2		
	#	Team	Make	#	Team	Make
1	1	(Netherlands) Daniël Willemsen / Sven Verbrugge	Zabel-WSP	1	(Netherlands) Daniël Willemsen / Sven Verbrugge	Zabel-WSP
2	2	(Belgium) Joris Hendrickx / Kaspars Liepiņš	KTM-VMC	2	(Belgium) Joris Hendrickx / Kaspars Liepiņš	KTM-VMC
3	3	(Belgium) Jan Hendrickx / Tim Smeuninx	Zabel-VMC	8	(Latvia) Jānis Daiders / Lauris Daiders	Zabel-VMC
4	111	(United Kingdom) Stuart Brown / Josh Chamberlain	Husaberg-MEFO	3	(Belgium) Jan Hendrickx / Tim Smeuninx	Zabel-VMC
5	8	(Latvia) Jānis Daiders / Lauris Daiders	Zabel-VMC	111	(United Kingdom) Stuart Brown / Josh Chamberlain	Husaberg-MEFO
6	6	(Belgium) Ben Adriaenssen / Guennady Auvray	KTM-VMC	4	(Netherlands) Etienne Bax / Ben van den Boogaert	Zabel-VMC
7	38	(France) Valentin Giraud / Nicolas Musset	KTM-WHT	14	(United Kingdom) Daniel Millard / Joe Millard	Husaberg-WHT
8	20	(Russia) Ewgeny Scherbinin / Haralds Kurpnieks	Zabel-WSP	11	(Czech Republic) Vaclav Rozehnal / Marek Rozehnal	Zabel-VMC
9	11	(Czech Republic) Vaclav Rozehnal / Marek Rozehnal	Zabel-VMC	15	(Germany) Marko Happich / Meinrad Schelbert	Zabel-VMC
10	23	(Sweden) Henrik Söderquvist / Juho Saloniemi	Husaberg-VMC	25	(Netherlands) Marcel Willemsen / Gertie Eggink	Zabel-WSP

=== Chernivtsi – Ukraine ===
The top ten of the Ukrainian Grand Prix in 2011, held on 8 May at Chernivtsi:

Top Ten Finishers
Pos.	Race 1			Race 2		
	#	Team	Make	#	Team	Make
1	1	(Netherlands) Daniël Willemsen / Sven Verbrugge	Zabel-WSP	1	(Netherlands) Daniël Willemsen / Sven Verbrugge	Zabel-WSP
2	2	(Belgium) Joris Hendrickx / Kaspars Liepiņš	KTM-VMC	2	(Belgium) Joris Hendrickx / Kaspars Liepiņš	KTM-VMC
3	4	(Netherlands) Etienne Bax / Ben van den Boogaert	Zabel-VMC	3	(Belgium) Jan Hendrickx / Tim Smeuninx	Zabel-VMC
4	3	(Belgium) Jan Hendrickx / Tim Smeuninx	Zabel-VMC	20	(Russia) Ewgeny Scherbinin / Haralds Kurpnieks	Zabel-WSP
5	15	(Germany) Marko Happich / Meinrad Schelbert	Zabel-VMC	8	(Latvia) Jānis Daiders / Lauris Daiders	Zabel-VMC
6	20	(Russia) Ewgeny Scherbinin / Haralds Kurpnieks	Zabel-WSP	7	(Czech Republic) Tomas Cermak / Ondrej Cermak	JAWA-MEFO
7	5	(Latvia) Māris Rupeiks / Kaspars Stupelis	Zabel-WSP	6	(Belgium) Ben Adriaenssen / Guennady Auvray	KTM-VMC
8	6	(Belgium) Ben Adriaenssen / Guennady Auvray	KTM-VMC	4	(Netherlands) Etienne Bax / Ben van den Boogaert	Zabel-VMC
9	22	(Sweden) Robert Gustavsson / Henrik Apelgren	Husaberg-VMC	5	(Latvia) Māris Rupeiks / Kaspars Stupelis	Zabel-WSP
10	7	(Czech Republic) Tomas Cermak / Ondrej Cermak	JAWA-MEFO	22	(Sweden) Robert Gustavsson / Henrik Apelgren	Husaberg-VMC

=== Brou – France ===
The top ten of the second French Grand Prix in 2011, held on 13 June at Brou, Eure-et-Loir:

Top Ten Finishers
Pos.	Race 1			Race 2		
	#	Team	Make	#	Team	Make
1	1	(Netherlands) Daniël Willemsen / Sven Verbrugge	Zabel-WSP	2	(Belgium) Joris Hendrickx / Kaspars Liepiņš	KTM-VMC
2	8	(Latvia) Jānis Daiders / Lauris Daiders	Zabel-VMC	1	(Netherlands) Daniël Willemsen / Sven Verbrugge	Zabel-WSP
3	2	(Belgium) Joris Hendrickx / Kaspars Liepiņš	KTM-VMC	8	(Latvia) Jānis Daiders / Lauris Daiders	Zabel-VMC
4	3	(Belgium) Jan Hendrickx / Tim Smeuninx	Zabel-VMC	15	(Germany) Marko Happich / Meinrad Schelbert	Zabel-VMC
5	11	(Czech Republic) Vaclav Rozehnal / Marek Rozehnal	Zabel-VMC	38	(France) Valentin Giraud / Nicolas Musset	KTM-WHT
6	4	(Netherlands) Etienne Bax / Ben van den Boogaert	Zabel-VMC	3	(Belgium) Jan Hendrickx / Tim Smeuninx	Zabel-VMC
7	20	(Russia) Ewgeny Scherbinin / Haralds Kurpnieks	Zabel-WSP	4	(Netherlands) Etienne Bax / Ben van den Boogaert	Zabel-VMC
8	14	(United Kingdom) Daniel Millard / Joe Millard	Husaberg-WHT	20	(Russia) Ewgeny Scherbinin / Haralds Kurpnieks	Zabel-WSP
9	5	(Latvia) Māris Rupeiks / Kaspars Stupelis	Zabel-WSP	6	(Belgium) Ben Adriaenssen / Guennady Auvray	KTM-VMC
10	15	(Germany) Marko Happich / Meinrad Schelbert	Zabel-VMC	11	(Czech Republic) Vaclav Rozehnal / Marek Rozehnal	Zabel-VMC

=== Gdańsk – Poland ===
The top ten of the Polish Grand Prix in 2011, held on 26 June at Gdańsk:

Top Ten Finishers
Pos.	Race 1			Race 2		
	#	Team	Make	#	Team	Make
1	1	(Netherlands) Daniël Willemsen / Sven Verbrugge	Zabel-WSP	2	(Belgium) Joris Hendrickx / Kaspars Liepiņš	KTM-VMC
2	2	(Belgium) Joris Hendrickx / Kaspars Liepiņš	KTM-VMC	1	(Netherlands) Daniël Willemsen / Sven Verbrugge	Zabel-WSP
3	4	(Netherlands) Etienne Bax / Ben van den Boogaert	Zabel-VMC	3	(Belgium) Jan Hendrickx / Tim Smeuninx	Zabel-VMC
4	8	(Latvia) Jānis Daiders / Lauris Daiders	Zabel-VMC	4	(Netherlands) Etienne Bax / Ben van den Boogaert	Zabel-VMC
5	3	(Belgium) Jan Hendrickx / Tim Smeuninx	Zabel-VMC	8	(Latvia) Jānis Daiders / Lauris Daiders	Zabel-VMC
6	20	(Russia) Ewgeny Scherbinin / Haralds Kurpnieks	Zabel-WSP	20	(Russia) Ewgeny Scherbinin / Haralds Kurpnieks	Zabel-WSP
7	6	(Belgium) Ben Adriaenssen / Guennady Auvray	KTM-VMC	14	(United Kingdom) Daniel Millard / Joe Millard	Husaberg-WHT
8	14	(United Kingdom) Daniel Millard / Joe Millard	Husaberg-WHT	6	(Belgium) Ben Adriaenssen / Guennady Auvray	KTM-VMC
9	5	(Latvia) Māris Rupeiks / Elvijs Mucenieks	Zabel-WSP	15	(Germany) Marko Happich / Meinrad Schelbert	Zabel-VMC
10	11	(Czech Republic) Vaclav Rozehnal / Marek Rozehnal	Zabel-VMC	22	(Sweden) Robert Gustavsson / Henrik Apelgren	Husaberg-VMC

=== Genk – Belgium ===
The top ten of the Belgian Grand Prix in 2011, held on 3 July at Genk:

Top Ten Finishers
Pos.	Race 1			Race 2		
	#	Team	Make	#	Team	Make
1	1	(Netherlands) Daniël Willemsen / Sven Verbrugge	Zabel-WSP	1	(Netherlands) Daniël Willemsen / Sven Verbrugge	Zabel-WSP
2	3	(Belgium) Jan Hendrickx / Tim Smeuninx	Zabel-VMC	4	(Netherlands) Etienne Bax / Ben van den Boogaert	Zabel-VMC
3	6	(Belgium) Ben Adriaenssen / Guennady Auvray	KTM-VMC	2	(Belgium) Joris Hendrickx / Kaspars Liepiņš	KTM-VMC
4	38	(France) Valentin Giraud / Nicolas Musset	KTM-WHT	8	(Latvia) Jānis Daiders / Lauris Daiders	Zabel-VMC
5	8	(Latvia) Jānis Daiders / Lauris Daiders	Zabel-VMC	5	(Latvia) Māris Rupeiks / Kaspars Stupelis	Zabel-WSP
6	5	(Latvia) Māris Rupeiks / Kaspars Stupelis	Zabel-WSP	38	(France) Valentin Giraud / Nicolas Musset	KTM-WHT
7	2	(Belgium) Joris Hendrickx / Kaspars Liepiņš	KTM-VMC	11	(Czech Republic) Vaclav Rozehnal / Marek Rozehnal	Zabel-VMC
8	11	(Czech Republic) Vaclav Rozehnal / Marek Rozehnal	Zabel-VMC	3	(Belgium) Jan Hendrickx / Tim Smeuninx	Zabel-VMC
9	10	(Netherlands) Jan Visscher / Jeroen Visscher	Zabel-VMC	14	(United Kingdom) Daniel Millard / Joe Millard	Husaberg-WHT
10	14	(United Kingdom) Daniel Millard / Joe Millard	Husaberg-WHT	18	(Switzerland) Andy Bürgler / Raphael Markert	KTM-VMC

=== Strassbessenbach – Germany ===
The top ten of the first of two German Grand Prix in 2011, held on 24 July at Strassbessenbach:

Top Ten Finishers
Pos.	Race 1			Race 2		
	#	Team	Make	#	Team	Make
1	1	(Netherlands) Daniël Willemsen / Ondrej Cermak	Zabel-WSP	1	(Netherlands) Daniël Willemsen / Ondrej Cermak	Zabel-WSP
2	5	(Latvia) Māris Rupeiks / Kaspars Stupelis	Zabel-WSP	5	(Latvia) Māris Rupeiks / Kaspars Stupelis	Zabel-WSP
3	8	(Latvia) Jānis Daiders / Lauris Daiders	Zabel-VMC	8	(Latvia) Jānis Daiders / Lauris Daiders	Zabel-VMC
4	6	(Belgium) Ben Adriaenssen / Guennady Auvray	KTM-VMC	38	(France) Valentin Giraud / Nicolas Musset	KTM-WHT
5	20	(Russia) Ewgeny Scherbinin / Haralds Kurpnieks	Zabel-WSP	6	(Belgium) Ben Adriaenssen / Guennady Auvray	KTM-VMC
6	11	(Czech Republic) Vaclav Rozehnal / Marek Rozehnal	Zabel-VMC	11	(Czech Republic) Vaclav Rozehnal / Marek Rozehnal	Zabel-VMC
7	2	(Belgium) Joris Hendrickx / Kaspars Liepiņš	KTM-VMC	20	(Russia) Ewgeny Scherbinin / Haralds Kurpnieks	Zabel-WSP
8	38	(France) Valentin Giraud / Nicolas Musset	KTM-WHT	2	(Belgium) Joris Hendrickx / Kaspars Liepiņš	KTM-VMC
9	15	(Germany) Marko Happich / Meinrad Schelbert	Zabel-VMC	18	(Switzerland) Andy Bürgler / Raphael Markert	KTM-VMC
10	14	(United Kingdom) Daniel Millard / Joe Millard	Husaberg-WHT	15	(Germany) Marko Happich / Meinrad Schelbert	Zabel-VMC

=== Ķegums – Latvia ===
The top ten of the Latvian Grand Prix in 2011, held on 7 August at Ķegums:

Top Ten Finishers
Pos.	Race 1			Race 2		
	#	Team	Make	#	Team	Make
1	6	(Belgium) Ben Adriaenssen / Guennady Auvray	KTM-VMC	5	(Latvia) Māris Rupeiks / Kaspars Stupelis	Zabel-WSP
2	5	(Latvia) Māris Rupeiks / Kaspars Stupelis	Zabel-WSP	6	(Belgium) Ben Adriaenssen / Guennady Auvray	KTM-VMC
3	8	(Latvia) Jānis Daiders / Lauris Daiders	Zabel-VMC	11	(Czech Republic) Vaclav Rozehnal / Marek Rozehnal	Zabel-VMC
4	3	(Belgium) Jan Hendrickx / Tim Smeuninx	Zabel-VMC	20	(Russia) Ewgeny Scherbinin / Haralds Kurpnieks	Zabel-WSP
5	1	(Netherlands) Daniël Willemsen / Sven Verbrugge	Zabel-WSP	23	(Sweden) Henrik Söderquvist / Timo Gustavsson	Husaberg-VMC
6	11	(Czech Republic) Vaclav Rozehnal / Marek Rozehnal	Zabel-VMC	18	(Switzerland) Andy Bürgler / Raphael Markert	KTM-VMC
7	18	(Switzerland) Andy Bürgler / Raphael Markert	KTM-VMC	3	(Belgium) Jan Hendrickx / Tim Smeuninx	Zabel-VMC
8	15	(Germany) Marko Happich / Meinrad Schelbert	Zabel-VMC	17	(Netherlands) Thijs Derks / Robbie Bax	Husaberg-EML
9	26	(Russia) Igor Rodionov / Dimitri Rodionov	KTM-VMC	14	(United Kingdom) Daniel Millard / Joe Millard	Husaberg-WHT
10	22	(Sweden) Robert Gustavsson / Henrik Apelgren	Husaberg-VMC	26	(Russia) Igor Rodionov / Dimitri Rodionov	KTM-VMC

=== Kiviõli – Estonia ===
The top ten of the Estonian Grand Prix in 2011, held on 14 August at Kiviõli:

Top Ten Finishers
Pos.	Race 1			Race 2		
	#	Team	Make	#	Team	Make
1	4	(Netherlands) Etienne Bax / Ben van den Boogaert	Zabel-VMC	11	(Czech Republic) Vaclav Rozehnal / Marek Rozehnal	Zabel-VMC
2	3	(Belgium) Jan Hendrickx / Tim Smeuninx	Zabel-VMC	5	(Latvia) Māris Rupeiks / Kaspars Stupelis	Zabel-WSP
3	8	(Latvia) Jānis Daiders / Lauris Daiders	Zabel-VMC	20	(Russia) Ewgeny Scherbinin / Haralds Kurpnieks	Zabel-WSP
4	5	(Latvia) Māris Rupeiks / Kaspars Stupelis	Zabel-WSP	1	(Netherlands) Daniël Willemsen / Sven Verbrugge	Zabel-WSP
5	11	(Czech Republic) Vaclav Rozehnal / Marek Rozehnal	Zabel-VMC	6	(Belgium) Ben Adriaenssen / Guennady Auvray	KTM-VMC
6	15	(Germany) Marko Happich / Meinrad Schelbert	Zabel-VMC	8	(Latvia) Jānis Daiders / Lauris Daiders	Zabel-VMC
7	1	(Netherlands) Daniël Willemsen / Sven Verbrugge	Zabel-WSP	15	(Germany) Marko Happich / Meinrad Schelbert	Zabel-VMC
8	17	(Netherlands) Thijs Derks / Robbie Bax	Husaberg-EML	14	(United Kingdom) Daniel Millard / Joe Millard	Husaberg-WHT
9	23	(Sweden) Henrik Söderquvist / Timo Gustavsson	Husaberg-VMC	26	(Russia) Igor Rodionov / Dimitri Rodionov	KTM-VMC
10	14	(United Kingdom) Daniel Millard / Joe Millard	Husaberg-WHT	98	(Czech Republic) Lukas Cerny / Andreas Zinckernagel	JAWA/MEFO

The race at Kiviõli saw the first-ever Sidecarcross Grand Prix win for Vaclav and Marek Rozehnal and the first-ever for the Czech Republic.

=== Kamensk-Uralsky – Russia ===
The top ten of the Russian Grand Prix in 2011, held on 21 August at Kamensk-Uralsky:

Top Ten Finishers
Pos.	Race 1			Race 2		
	#	Team	Make	#	Team	Make
1	1	(Netherlands) Daniël Willemsen / Sven Verbrugge	Zabel-WSP	1	(Netherlands) Daniël Willemsen / Sven Verbrugge	Zabel-WSP
2	4	(Netherlands) Etienne Bax / Ben van den Boogaert	Zabel-VMC	8	(Latvia) Jānis Daiders / Lauris Daiders	Zabel-VMC
3	6	(Belgium) Ben Adriaenssen / Guennady Auvray	KTM-VMC	4	(Netherlands) Etienne Bax / Ben van den Boogaert	Zabel-VMC
4	8	(Latvia) Jānis Daiders / Lauris Daiders	Zabel-VMC	6	(Belgium) Ben Adriaenssen / Guennady Auvray	KTM-VMC
5	5	(Latvia) Māris Rupeiks / Kaspars Stupelis	Zabel-WSP	5	(Latvia) Māris Rupeiks / Kaspars Stupelis	Zabel-WSP
6	3	(Belgium) Jan Hendrickx / Tim Smeuninx	Zabel-VMC	3	(Belgium) Jan Hendrickx / Tim Smeuninx	Zabel-VMC
7	15	(Germany) Marko Happich / Meinrad Schelbert	Zabel-VMC	14	(United Kingdom) Daniel Millard / Joe Millard	Husaberg-WHT
8	14	(United Kingdom) Daniel Millard / Joe Millard	Husaberg-WHT	15	(Germany) Marko Happich / Meinrad Schelbert	Zabel-VMC
9	20	(Russia) Ewgeny Scherbinin / Haralds Kurpnieks	Zabel-WSP	26	(Russia) Igor Rodionov / Dimitri Rodionov	KTM-VMC
10		(Russia) Roman Koch / Aleksey Bessarabov		10	(Netherlands) Jan Visscher / Jeroen Visscher	Zabel-VMC

=== Slagelse – Denmark ===
The top ten of the Danish Grand Prix in 2011, held on 4 September at Slagelse:

Top Ten Finishers
Pos.	Race 1			Race 2		
	#	Team	Make	#	Team	Make
1	8	(Latvia) Jānis Daiders / Lauris Daiders	Zabel-VMC	4	(Netherlands) Etienne Bax / Ben van den Boogaert	Zabel-VMC
2	4	(Netherlands) Etienne Bax / Ben van den Boogaert	Zabel-VMC	6	(Belgium) Ben Adriaenssen / Guennady Auvray	KTM-VMC
3	6	(Belgium) Ben Adriaenssen / Guennady Auvray	KTM-VMC	15	(Germany) Marko Happich / Meinrad Schelbert	Zabel-VMC
4	14	(United Kingdom) Daniel Millard / Joe Millard	Husaberg-WHT	8	(Latvia) Jānis Daiders / Lauris Daiders	Zabel-VMC
5	15	(Germany) Marko Happich / Meinrad Schelbert	Zabel-VMC	1	(Netherlands) Daniël Willemsen / Sven Verbrugge	Zabel-WSP
6	20	(Russia) Ewgeny Scherbinin / Haralds Kurpnieks	Zabel-WSP	20	(Russia) Ewgeny Scherbinin / Haralds Kurpnieks	Zabel-WSP
7	3	(Belgium) Jan Hendrickx / Tim Smeuninx	Zabel-VMC	14	(United Kingdom) Daniel Millard / Joe Millard	Husaberg-WHT
8	5	(Latvia) Māris Rupeiks / Kaspars Stupelis	Zabel-WSP	111	(United Kingdom) Stuart Brown / Josh Chamberlain	Husaberg-MEFO
9	30	(Netherlands) Carlo van Duijnhoven / Matthieu Cailleau	Zabel-VMC	18	(Switzerland) Andy Bürgler / Raphael Markert	KTM-VMC
10	10	(Netherlands) Jan Visscher / Jeroen Visscher	Zabel-VMC	5	(Latvia) Māris Rupeiks / Kaspars Stupelis	Zabel-WSP

=== Rudersberg – Germany ===
The top ten of the second German Grand Prix in 2011, held on 11 September at Rudersberg:

Top Ten Finishers
Pos.	Race 1			Race 2		
	#	Team	Make	#	Team	Make
1	38	(France) Valentin Giraud / Nicolas Musset	KTM-WHT	4	(Netherlands) Etienne Bax / Ben van den Boogaert	Zabel-VMC
2	8	(Latvia) Jānis Daiders / Lauris Daiders	Zabel-VMC	8	(Latvia) Jānis Daiders / Lauris Daiders	Zabel-VMC
3	3	(Belgium) Jan Hendrickx / Tim Smeuninx	Zabel-VMC	15	(Germany) Marko Happich / Meinrad Schelbert	Zabel-VMC
4	4	(Netherlands) Etienne Bax / Ben van den Boogaert	Zabel-VMC	6	(Belgium) Ben Adriaenssen / Guennady Auvray	KTM-VMC
5	111	(United Kingdom) Stuart Brown / Josh Chamberlain	Husaberg-MEFO	38	(France) Valentin Giraud / Nicolas Musset	KTM-WHT
6	15	(Germany) Marko Happich / Meinrad Schelbert	Zabel-VMC	14	(United Kingdom) Daniel Millard / Joe Millard	Husaberg-WHT
7	18	(Switzerland) Andy Bürgler / Raphael Markert	KTM-VMC	3	(Belgium) Jan Hendrickx / Tim Smeuninx	Zabel-VMC
8	11	(Czech Republic) Vaclav Rozehnal / Marek Rozehnal	Zabel-VMC	18	(Switzerland) Andy Bürgler / Raphael Markert	KTM-VMC
9	20	(Russia) Ewgeny Scherbinin / Haralds Kurpnieks	Zabel-WSP	5	(Latvia) Māris Rupeiks / Kaspars Stupelis	Zabel-WSP
10	5	(Latvia) Māris Rupeiks / Kaspars Stupelis	Zabel-WSP	23	(Sweden) Henrik Söderquvist / Andre Saam	Husaberg-VMC

The last race event of the 2011 season saw the World Champions, Willemsen and Verbrugge, failing to score any points. A dispute during qualifying between the two lead to Verbrugge walking out during the first qualifying session. He later returned to take part in the "last chance", where the team qualified for the race after all. Verbrugge however was injured during a fall and had to be taken to hospital where his arm was placed into a plaster, ruling the team out of the race.

=== Notes ===
Grand Prix winner

- Flags for passengers not shown.
