= 2014 Sidecarcross World Championship =

Season
- Grands Prix: 10
- Duration: 13 April 2014–21 September 2014

Drivers
- Champions: (Belgium) Ben Adriaenssen (Netherlands) Ben van den Bogaart
- Sidecarcross des Nations: Belgium

The 2014 FIM Sidecarcross World Championship, the 35th edition of the competition, started on 13 April and finished after ten Grand Prix weekends on 21 September 2014.

The defending champions were Ben Adriaenssen from Belgium and his Dutch passenger Ben van den Bogaart, who won their first title in 2013. The pair defended their title while the Dutch-Latvian combination of Etienne Bax and Kaspars Stupelis finished runners-up for the third consecutive time. Third place went to the British duo of Stuart Brown and Josh Chamberlain, their highest-ever finish.

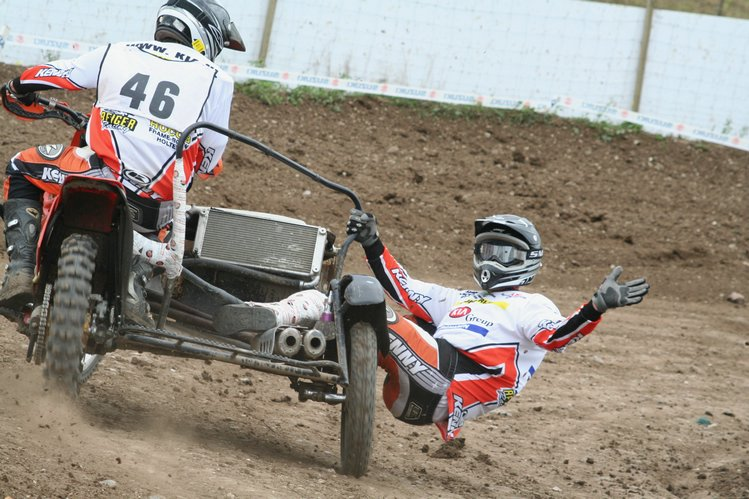
Sidecarcross passenger in action

The Sidecarcross World Championship, first held in 1980 and organised by the Fédération Internationale de Motocyclisme, is an annual competition. All races, manufacturers and the vast majority of riders in the competition being in and from Europe. Sidecarcross is similar to motocross except that the teams consist of two riders, a driver and a passenger. Races are held on the same tracks as solo motocross but the handling of the machines differs as sidecars do not lean. The majority of physical work in the sport is carried out by the passenger, who speeds up the sidecarcross in corners by leaning out. The coordination between the driver and the passenger are therefore of highest importance.

While usually a male-dominated sport the 2014 season saw the participation of a woman driver in the competition. Belgian Sabrina van Calster was able to score two points in the first race of the Swiss Grand Prix.

== Overview ==
The ten Grands Prix of the season were held in eight countries, Switzerland, Germany (two events), Czech Republic, Netherlands, France (three events), Estonia and Latvia. No Grands Prix were initially added or removed from the calendar in comparison to the 2013 season but Germany, which held three events in 2013, had this number reduced to two. An eleventh Grand Prix, to be held in Belgium was cancelled because of severe weather shortly before being staged. A twelfth Grand Prix, scheduled to be held in Ukraine on 18 May, was cancelled because of the ongoing Russo-Ukrainian war before the start of the season. The second race of the final Grand Prix of the season was also cancelled because of the track conditions after heavy rainfall.

== Format ==
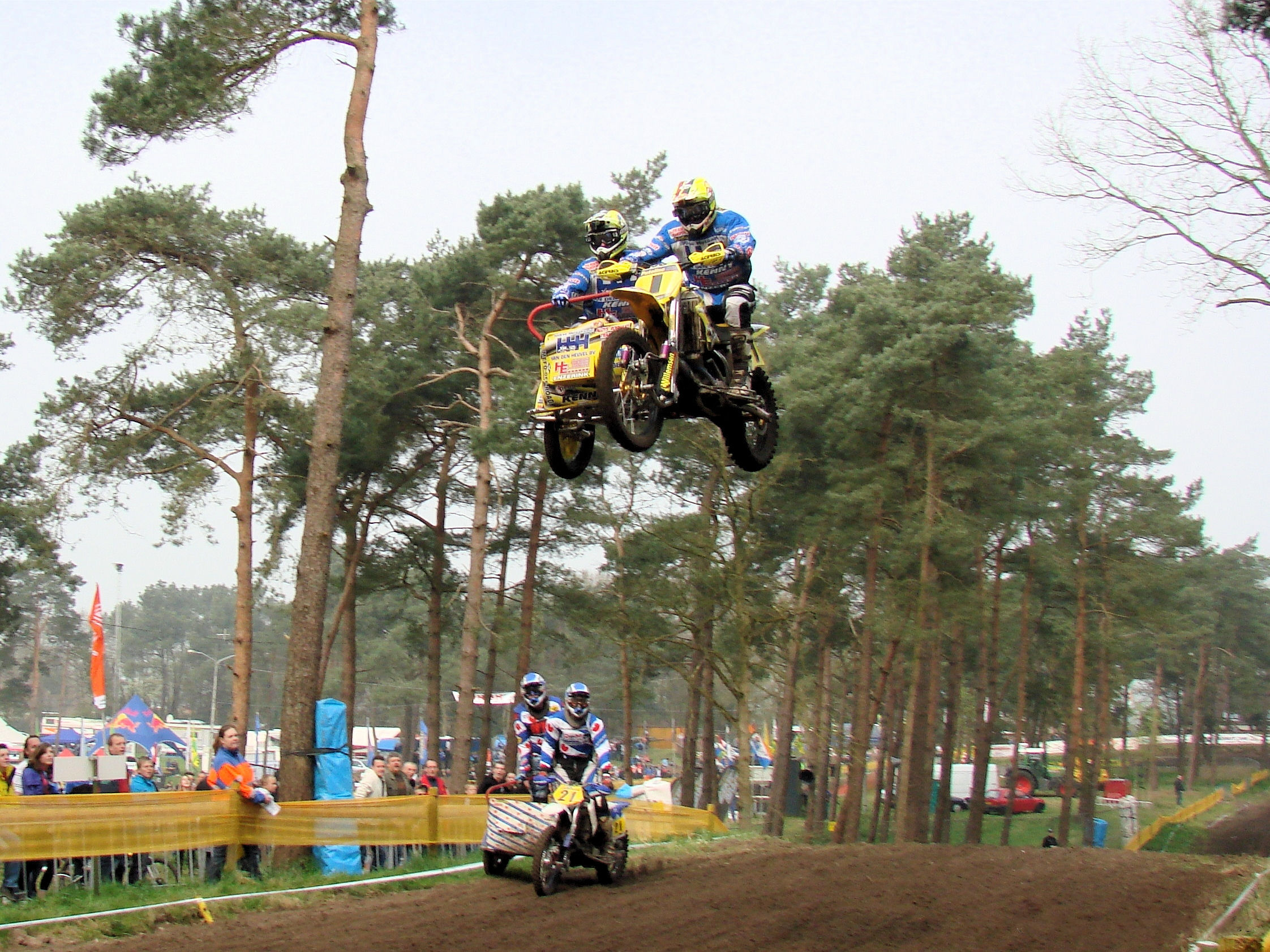
Ten time World Champion Daniël Willemsen in action in 2009.

Every Grand Prix weekend was split into two races, both held on the same day. This meant that the 2014 season, with its ten Grands Prix, had nominally 20 races, however, only 19 were held. Each race lasted for 30 minutes plus two laps. The two races on a weekend actually get combined to determine an overall winner. In case of a tie, the results of the second race were used to determine the winner. While this overall winner received no extra world championship points, they usually were awarded a special trophy. Race start times were set at 13:30 and 16:00.

Events typically consisted of a qualifying competition, held in multiple stages on Saturdays of a race weekend while the two race events were typically held on Sundays. One exception to this rule is Easter weekends, when the races were held on Easter Monday. Race weekends could consist of additional motocross or quart support races as well, but the FIM stipulates that the World Championship races have priority. Riders had to be provided with at least one 30 minute free practice season, which was timed. A race can consist of up to 30 starters and the qualifying modus is dependent on the number of entries. Up to 32 entries, it was held in one group split into two sessions of 30 minutes each. Above 32 entries, the starter field was sub-divided into two groups through ballot and the current standings. Each qualifying group can consist of up to 30 racers. Should there be more than 60 entries, a pre-qualifying has to be held. Of the riders in the two groups, the top-twelve directly qualified for the races. The remaining teams then go to a second-chance qualifying, in which the best six advanced. The riders placed seventh and eighth remained in reserve should one of the qualified teams be unable to participate.

The FIM stipulated that all drivers must be of a minimum age of 18 while passengers had to be at least 16 years old to compete, but no older than 50. Riders older than 50 had to provide a certificate of medical fitness to be permitted to compete. The driver had the right to exchange his passenger under certain conditions.

The engines permitted in the competition in 2014 were 2-stroke from 350 to 750 cc or 4-stroke up to 1,000 cc.

Starting numbers for the season were awarded according to the previous season's overall finishing position of the driver. Current or former World Champions had however the right to pick any number they wished, except the number one which was reserved for the current World Champion.

The competition was open for motor cycles with two-stroke engines from between 350 and 750cc and four-stroke engines of up to 1,000cc. Each team was permitted the use of two motorcycles with the possibility of changing machines between races.

The FIM did not permit radio communication between riders and their teams. Outside assistance during the race on the course was not permitted unless it was through race marshals in the interest of safety. Limited repairs in the designated repair zone during the race were permitted.

The first twenty teams of each race scored competition points. The point system for the 2014 season was as follows:

| Place | Points |
|---|---|
| 1 | 25 |
| 2 | 22 |
| 3 | 20 |
| 4 | 18 |
| 5 | 16 |
| 6 | 15 |
| 7 | 14 |
| 8 | 13 |
| 9 | 12 |
| 10 | 11 |

| Place | Points |
|---|---|
| 11 | 10 |
| 12 | 9 |
| 13 | 8 |
| 14 | 7 |
| 15 | 6 |
| 16 | 5 |
| 17 | 4 |
| 18 | 3 |
| 19 | 2 |
| 20 | 1 |

== Prize money ==
In 2014 prize money was awarded to all rider scoring points, with €300 going to each race winner, €250 to the runners-up, gradually declining from there, with €50 going to all teams placed 12th to 20th. Additionally, every team qualified for the race plus the two reserve teams received €500 in travel compensation.

== Calendar ==
The calendar for the 2014 season:

| Date | Place | Race winners | GP winner | Source |
| 13 April | (Netherlands) Oss | (Netherlands) Daniël Willemsen / Robbie Bax | (Netherlands) Etienne Bax / Kaspars Stupelis | Result |
| 13 April | (Netherlands) Oss | (Netherlands) Etienne Bax / Kaspars Stupelis | (Netherlands) Etienne Bax / Kaspars Stupelis | Result |
| 4 May | (France) Plomion | (France) Valentin Giraud / Nicholas Musset | (Belgium) Ben Adriaenssen / Ben van den Bogaart | Result |
| 4 May | (France) Plomion | (Belgium) Ben Adriaenssen / Ben van den Bogaart | (Belgium) Ben Adriaenssen / Ben van den Bogaart | Result |
| 25 May | (Czech Republic) Kramolín | (Netherlands) Etienne Bax / Kaspars Stupelis | (Netherlands) Etienne Bax / Kaspars Stupelis | Result |
| 25 May | (Czech Republic) Kramolín | (Belgium) Ben Adriaenssen / Ben van den Bogaart | (Netherlands) Etienne Bax / Kaspars Stupelis | Result |
| 9 June | (France) Brou | (United Kingdom) Stuart Brown / Josh Chamberlain | (United Kingdom) Stuart Brown / Josh Chamberlain | Result |
| 9 June | (France) Brou | (France) Valentin Giraud / Nicolas Musset | (United Kingdom) Stuart Brown / Josh Chamberlain | Result |
| 13 July | (Belgium) Genk | canceled | | |
| 20 July | (Germany) Strassbessenbach | (Belgium) Ben Adriaenssen / Ben van den Bogaart | (Belgium) Ben Adriaenssen / Ben van den Bogaart | Result |
| 20 July | (Germany) Strassbessenbach | (Belgium) Ben Adriaenssen / Ben van den Bogaart | (Belgium) Ben Adriaenssen / Ben van den Bogaart | Result |
| 3 August | (Estonia) Kiviõli | (Belgium) Ben Adriaenssen / Ben van den Bogaart | (Belgium) Ben Adriaenssen / Ben van den Bogaart | Result |
| 3 August | (Estonia) Kiviõli | (Netherlands) Etienne Bax / Kaspars Stupelis | (Belgium) Ben Adriaenssen / Ben van den Bogaart | Result |
| 10 August | (Latvia) Ķegums | (Belgium) Ben Adriaenssen / Ben van den Bogaart | (Belgium) Ben Adriaenssen / Ben van den Bogaart | Result |
| 10 August | (Latvia) Ķegums | (Belgium) Ben Adriaenssen / Ben van den Bogaart | (Belgium) Ben Adriaenssen / Ben van den Bogaart | Result |
| 24 August | (Switzerland) Roggenburg | (Netherlands) Etienne Bax / Kaspars Stupelis | (Netherlands) Etienne Bax / Kaspars Stupelis | Result |
| 24 August | (Switzerland) Roggenburg | (Netherlands) Etienne Bax / Kaspars Stupelis | (Netherlands) Etienne Bax / Kaspars Stupelis | Result |
| 14 September | (France) Vesoul | (Netherlands) Etienne Bax / Kaspars Stupelis | (Netherlands) Etienne Bax / Kaspars Stupelis | Result |
| 14 September | (France) Vesoul | (Netherlands) Etienne Bax / Kaspars Stupelis | (Netherlands) Etienne Bax / Kaspars Stupelis | Result |
| 21 September | (Germany) Rudersberg | (Netherlands) Etienne Bax / Kaspars Stupelis | (Netherlands) Etienne Bax / Kaspars Stupelis | Result |
| 21 September | (Germany) Rudersberg | canceled | (Netherlands) Etienne Bax / Kaspars Stupelis | Result |
| 12 October | (Netherlands) Markelo | Belgium | | |

- The Sidecarcross des Nations was a non-championship event, but part of the 2014 calendar and is denoted by a light blue background in the table.
- Passenger in italics. Flags for passengers not shown.

== Classification ==
=== Riders ===
The top ten teams in the final standings were:

| Position | Driver / Passenger | Equipment | Bike No | Points |
| 1 | (Belgium) Ben Adriaenssen / (Netherlands) Ben van den Bogaart | Husqvarna-WSP | 1 | 420 |
| 2 | (Netherlands) Etienne Bax / (Latvia) Kaspars Stupelis | Zabel-WSP | 2 | 402 |
| 3 | (United Kingdom) Stuart Brown / (United Kingdom) Josh Chamberlain | Zabel-WSP | 6 | 317 |
| 4 | (Belgium) Jan Hendrickx / (Latvia) Elvijs Mucenieks | KTM-WSP | 3 | 315 |
| 5 | (France) Valentin Giraud / (France) Nicholas Musset | KTM-WHT | 100 | 301 |
| 6 | (Sweden) Philip Stenborg / (Sweden) Simon Stenborg | Zabel-VMC | 9 | 206 |
| 7 | (Belgium) Jason van Daele / (Belgium) Tim Smeuninx | Zabel-WHT | 10 | 190 |
| 8 | (Czech Republic) Vaclav Rozehnal / Jakub Vejchoda | Zabel-VMC | 5 | 181 |
| 9 | (Netherlands) Daniel Willemsen / (Netherlands) Robbie Bax | Zabel-WSP | 111 | 179 |
| 10 | (United Kingdom) Daniel Millard / (United Kingdom) Joe Millard | KTM-WHT | 32 | 165 |

=== Manufacturers ===
Parallel to the riders championship, a manufacturers competition was also held. In every race, only the best-placed rider of every make was awarded points in this competition.

The final standings in the manufacturers competition were:

| Position | Manufacturer | Points |
| 1 | WSP | 442 |
| 2 | WHT | 335 |
| 3 | VMC | 254 |
| 4 | EML | 87 |
| 5 | AYR | 9 |
| 6 | HOCOB | 0 |
