= Stuart Brown (sidecarcross rider) =

British sidecarcross rider

- Nationality: British
- Born: 29 June 1972 (age 54)
- Bike number: 5
- Website: Official website
Motorcycle racing career statistics
Sidecarcross World Championship
Active years	1986 - present
Manufacturers	Zabel-Cradley (1997) Cradley-BHC (1998) Zabel-BMC (1999) Zabel-BSU (2000) Zabel-VMC (2001–2008) Husaberg-VMC (2009–2011) Zabel-MEFO (2012) Zabel-WSP (2013–present)
Championships	none
2015 championship position	5th
Starts / Wins / Podiums / Poles / F. laps / Points; 313 / 2 / 30 / / / 3,526

Stuart Brown (born 29 June 1972) is a British sidecarcross rider. Internationally, his greatest success has been two third place overall finishes (FIM Bronze Medal), achieved in the 2014 Sidecarcross World Championship and 2016 Sidecarcross World Championship. Domestically, he has won a record 14 national British Sidecarcross Championships.

== Racing career ==
=== British Championship ===
Brown started racing in the British Championship with passenger Luke Peters in 1996, entering the Sidecarcross World Championship in the following year. After an eighth place in their inaugural domestic season, the pair improved gradually, finishing runners-up in Britain in 2000 and 2001. After the retirement of ten-time champions Chris Etheridge in 2001, the pair won their first national title in 2002 and repeated this achievement in 2003.

In late 2004 and 2005, Brown raced with Jason Peters and, in 2005, also with Marc Cooper, as Luke Peters was recovering from a broken leg. In both seasons, he won the British Championship. In 2006, he won his fifth national title, now with Luke Peters again.

Brown and Peters missed most of the 2007 season because of a hand injury for Brown, unable to defend their national title. The pair took out three more British titles in 2008, 2009 and 2010 before Brown switched passengers. Now with Josh Chamberlain as his passenger, Brown won six more national titles from 2011 to 2016. By winning his 11th British national title in 2013, Brown set a new national record, surpassing the ten titles won by Chris Etheridge between 1991 and 2001.

In 2017, Brown would return to defend his British title, and was partnered by Joe Millard.

=== World Championship ===
Entering the Sidecarcross World Championship from 1997 onwards, Brown and Peters competed only sporadically for the first five seasons, never finishing higher than 20th overall. From 2002 onwards, their fortunes changed, with Brown finishing in the top-ten for the next five consecutive seasons, with two fifth-place finishes in 2003 and 2004 as his best results. In 2003, he also achieved his first-ever podium finish.

The 2007 season saw Brown compete only the first few races before a hand injury forced him out and the following year, 2008, Brown and Peters finished outside the top-ten again. In 2009, the team improved, coming ninth overall in the World Championship and winning their first-ever race in the competition, in the final race of the season in Rudersberg, Germany. From 2010 to 2012, Brown finished outside the top-ten, switching passengers after the 2010 season.

Brown's fortunes greatly improved in 2013 and 2014, now with Josh Chamberlain as his passenger. The pair finished in the top-ten in both seasons, with a third place overall in 2014 their best-ever result in the World Championship before 2016. The 2014 French Grand Prix in Brou saw Brown and Chamberlain take out their first-ever overall Grand Prix victory, ending a long Grand Prix-victory draught for British Sidecarcross riders.

In 2015, Brown was again partnered with Josh Chamberlain for the season. Brown scored another 5th place overall in the 2015. This was despite being forced to miss the round in Estonia entirely due to problems with the teams race transporter. Whilst a race win eluded Brown during the 2015 season, he did achieve ten race podiums, his highest total for a single season up to this point of his career.

For 2016, Brown rode with Josh Chamberlain, finishing 3rd in the world and gaining another FIM Bronze Medal 2016. For the second time in his career Brown won a Grand Prix overall, this time in Switzerland. This was the first time Brown had not only won the points overall but also won both legs of the event outright, dominating the weekend.

At the end of the 2016 season, passenger Josh Chamberlain announced his retirement from International Sidecarcross. Initially, there was some speculation over if Brown would retire as well. In December 2016, it was confirmed by Brown via Facebook and in UK Publication "Trials and Motocross News" (TMX) that he would return for a full British and Grand Prix season in 2017, partnered by Joe Millard.

== Personal life ==
Brown has been married to Clare Burgess since 2007, with the couple having three sons and one daughter, Brown, a carpenter by profession, lives with his family in Macclesfield, England.

== Season by season ==
The season by season results in the World Championship for Stuart Brown:

Season	Passenger	Equipment	Position	Points	Races	Wins	Second	Third
1997	Luke Peters	Zabel-Cradley	20	32	7	—	—	—
1998	Luke Peters	Cradley-BHC	36	8	2	—	—	—
1999	Luke Peters	Zabel-BMC	32	9	3	—	—	—
2000	Luke Peters	Zabel-BSU	33	12	3	—	—	—
2001	Luke Peters	Zabel-VMC	20	43	9	—	—	—
2002	Luke Peters	Zabel-VMC	6	332	28	—	—	—
2003	Luke Peters	Zabel-VMC	5	342	26	—	—	2
2004	Luke Peters Jason Peters	Zabel-VMC	5	374	22	—	4	3
2005	Jason Peters Mark Cooper	Zabel-VMC	9	197	19	—	2	—
2006	Luke Peters	Zabel-VMC	8	165	16	—	—	1
2007	Luke Peters	Zabel-VMC	24	35	7	—	—	—
2008	Luke Peters	Zabel-VMC	17	108	14	—	—	1
2009	Luke Peters	Husaberg-VMC	9	266	24	1	—	1
2010	Luke Peters	Husaberg-VMC	13	223	25	—	—	—
2011	Josh Chamberlain	Husaberg-VMC	17	122	14	—	—	—
2012	Josh Chamberlain	Zabel-MEFO	13	149	20	—	—	—
2013	Josh Chamberlain	Zabel-WSP	6	324	28	—	—	—
2014	Josh Chamberlain	Zabel-WSP	3	317	18	1	2	2
2015	Josh Chamberlain	Zabel-WSP	5	468	28	—	—	10
2016	Josh Chamberlain	Zabel-WSP						
Overall 1997 – 2015				3,526	313	2	8	20

=== Key ===
1	World Champions
2	Runners-up
3	Third placed
4 – 10	Driver finished fourth to tenth

== Honours ==
- British National Sidecarcross Championship
  - Winners: (13) 2002–2006, 2008–2017
  - Runners-up: (2) 2000, 2001

Sporting positions
Preceded by Chris Etheridge	British national sidecarcross champion 2002–2006	Succeeded by John Watson
Preceded by John Watson	British national sidecarcross champion 2008–present	Incumbent
