= Kramolín (Plzeň-South District) =

- Municipality
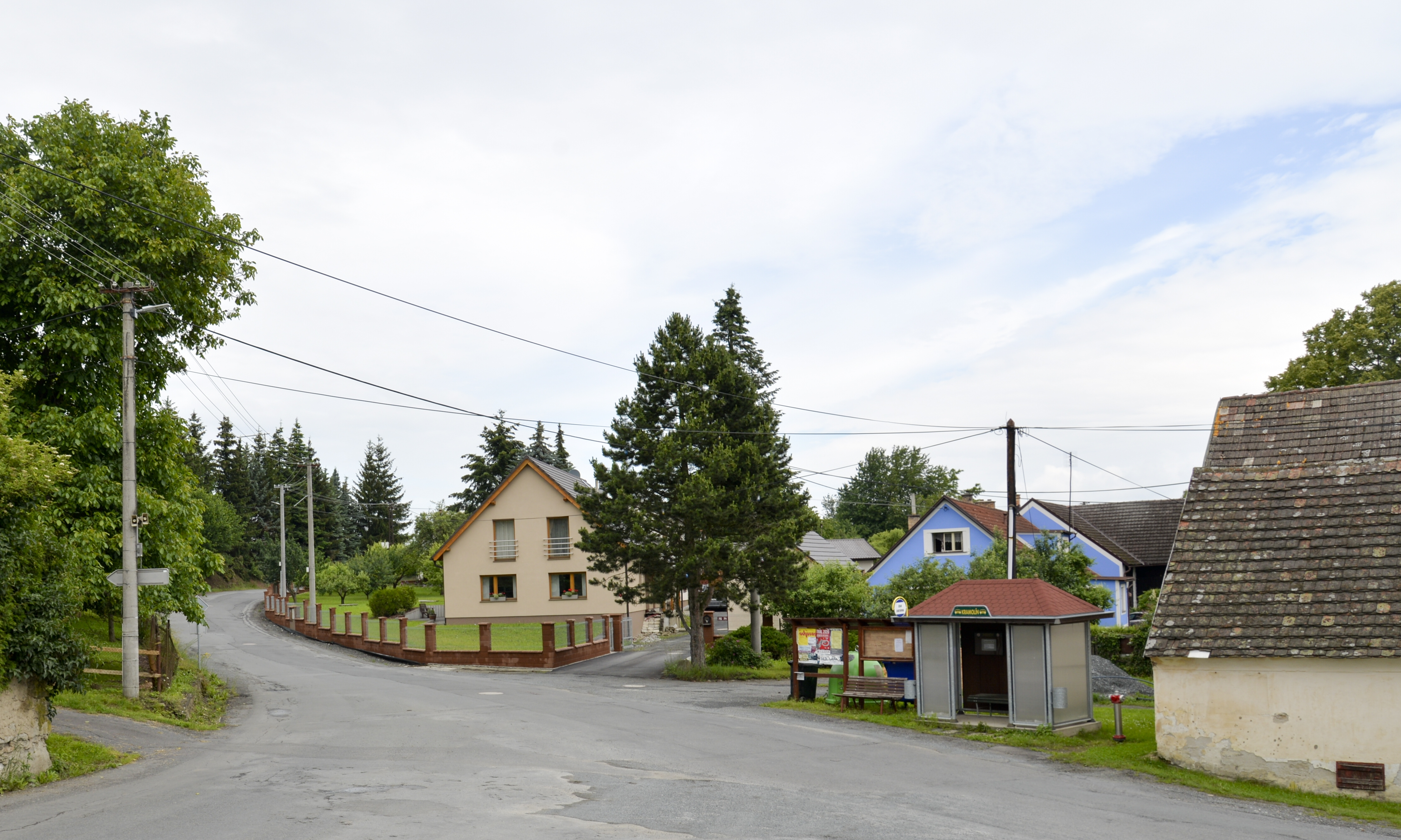
- Crossroads in the centre of Kramolín

- Location in the Czech Republic
- Coordinates: 49°26′46″N 13°34′37″E
- Country: Czech Republic
- Region: Plzeň
- District: Plzeň-South
- First mentioned: 1437

Area
  - Total: 3.68 km^{2} (1.42 sq mi)
- Elevation: 528 m (1,732 ft)

Population (2026-01-01)
  - Total: 111
  - Density: 30.2/km^{2} (78.1/sq mi)
- Time zone: UTC+1 (CET)
  - Summer (DST): UTC+2 (CEST)
- Postal code: 335 01
- Website: www.obec-kramolin.cz

Kramolín is a municipality and village in Plzeň-South District in the Plzeň Region of the Czech Republic. It has about 100 inhabitants.

== Etymology ==
The name Kramolín was derived either from the Old Czech word kramola (meaning 'quarrel') or from the personal name Kramola.

== Geography ==
Kramolín is located about 34 kilometres (21 mi) south of Plzeň. It lies in the Blatná Uplands. The highest point is near the top of the Ostrá hill at 599 m (1,965 ft) above sea level.

== History ==
The first written mention of Kramolín is from 1437. From the mid-16th century at the latest, it belonged to the Zelená Hora estate, owned by the Sternberg family. In 1630, half of the estate (including Kramolín) was bought by the Martinic family and Kramolín became part of the Plánice estate. In 1790, the Plánice estate was acquired by the Lords of Wallis, who owned it until the establishment of an independent municipality in 1850.

== Demographics ==
Historical population

Year	Pop.	±%
1869	402	—
1880	387	−3.7%
1890	385	−0.5%
1900	438	+13.8%
1910	412	−5.9%

Year	Pop.	±%
1921	389	−5.6%
1930	348	−10.5%
1950	250	−28.2%
1961	245	−2.0%
1970	203	−17.1%

Year	Pop.	±%
1980	148	−27.1%
1991	119	−19.6%
2001	98	−17.6%
2011	101	+3.1%
2021	101	+0.0%

Source: Censuses

== Transport ==
There are no railways or major roads passing through the municipality.

== Sport ==
Kramolín is known for a motocross racing track. It is a regular venue for Sidecarcross World Championship races.

== Sights ==
The main landmark of Kramolín is a chapel with an octagonal floor plan from the mid-19th century. In front of the chapel stands a memorial cross.
