= Bessenbach =

- Municipality
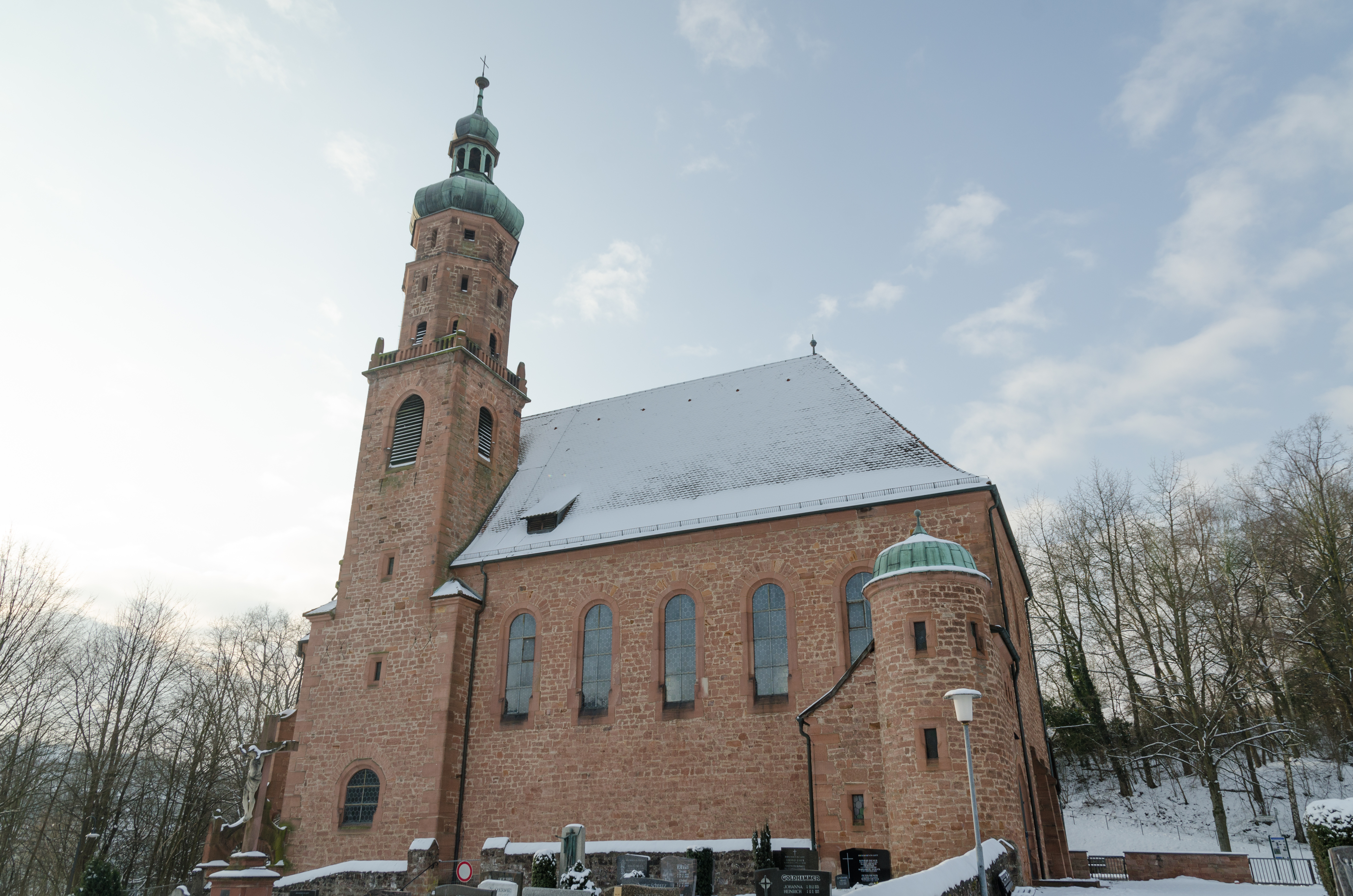
- Church of Saints Ottilia and Stephen

- Coat of arms

- Location of Bessenbach within Aschaffenburg district
- Interactive map of Bessenbach
- Location within Germany Location within Bavaria
- Coordinates: 49°58′N 09°16′E
- Country: Germany
- State: Bavaria
- Admin. region: Unterfranken
- District: Aschaffenburg
- Subdivisions: 3 Ortsteile

Government
  - Mayor (2020–26): Christoph Ruppert (CSU)

Area
  - Total: 29.99 km^{2} (11.58 sq mi)
- Elevation: 195 m (640 ft)

Population (2025-12-31)
  - Total: 5,373
  - Density: 179.2/km^{2} (464.0/sq mi)
- Time zone: UTC+01:00 (CET)
  - Summer (DST): UTC+02:00 (CEST)
- Postal codes: 63856
- Dialling codes: 06095
- Vehicle registration: AB
- Website: www.bessenbach.de

Bessenbach is a municipality in the Aschaffenburg district in the Regierungsbezirk of Lower Franconia (Unterfranken) in Bavaria, Germany.

== Geography ==
=== Location ===
Gemeindeteile

Bessenbach lies southeast of the town of Aschaffenburg among the Spessart range's outlying hills.

=== Subdivision ===
Bessenbach's Ortsteile are Beetacker, Frauengrund, Gemeindezentrum, Keilberg, Klingerhof, Klingermühle, Oberbessenbach, Steiger, Straßbessenbach, Unterbessenbach, Waldmichelbach and Weiler.

== History ==
The municipality was formed on 1 January 1972 through the merger of the municipalities of Keilberg and Straßbessenbach. In 1978, the municipality of Oberbessenbach followed.

== Governance ==
=== Municipal council ===
The council is made up of 20 council members.

	CSU	SPD	Total
2008	14	6	20 seats

(as at municipal election held on 2 March 2008)

=== Mayor ===
On 15 March 2020, Christoph Ruppert (CSU) was elected mayor.

=== Coat of arms ===
The municipality's arms might be described thus: Azure a stork argent armed gules with two heads, the sinister reguardant, in base a fess wavy of the second.

The formerly self-administering municipalities of Keilberg, Straßbessenbach and Oberbessenbach merged into a greater municipality in 1978, taking on the historical name of Bessenbach once again.

The local noble family, also called Bessenbach, were instrumental in the municipality's development. Their ancestral seat, a castle, stood in today's centre of Keilberg. The family's existence is documented as far back as the 12th century. They had lordly and juridical rights throughout the Bessenbach valley that they alienated in the late 13th century. The family arms – the two-headed stork – were later adopted as the charge in the municipality's arms. Standing for the Bessenbach, the brook that serves as the geographical link in the municipality named after it, is the wavy fess in the base of the escutcheon.

These arms have been borne since 28 November 1977.

=== Town twinning ===
- Dury, Somme, France
- Saint-Fuscien, Somme, France
- Sains-en-Amiénois, Somme, France

This is one partnership that Bessenbach has maintained with all three French communes since 1985.

== Infrastructure ==
=== Transport ===
The municipality is served by various bus lines of the Verkehrsgemeinschaft am Bayerischen Untermain ("Transport Association of the Bavarian Lower Main") from the main railway station in Aschaffenburg.

Moreover, Bessenbach lies right on the A 3 interchange Bessenbach/Waldaschaff and near the Spessart service centre near Rohrbrunn.

== Sports ==
The Ortsteil of Straßbessenbach has been host to the German Sidecarcross Grand Prix numerous times.
