= Cagnac-les-Mines =

- Commune
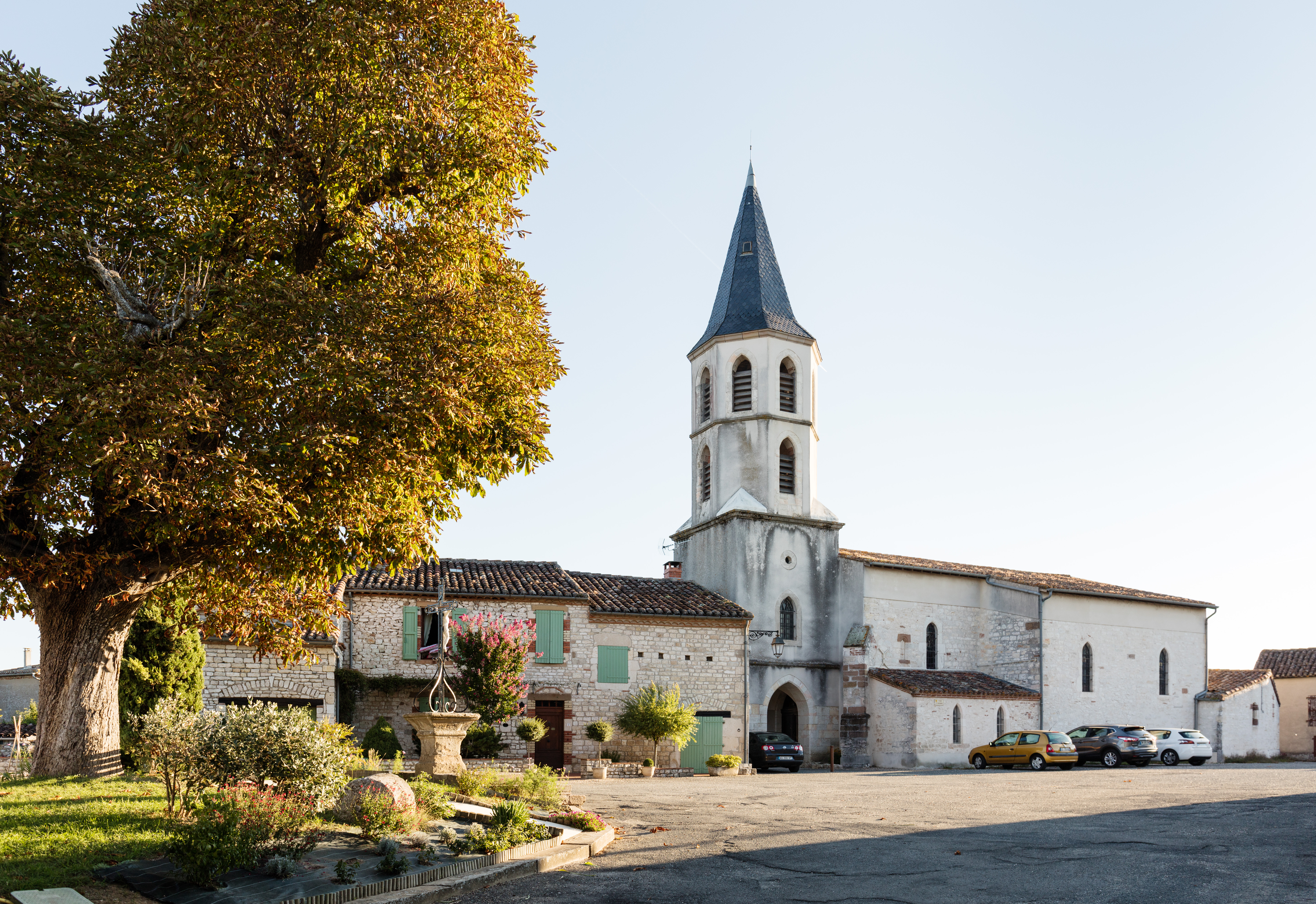
- A church in Saint-Sernin-les-Mailhoc

- Coat of arms
- Location of Cagnac-les-Mines
- Location within France Location within Occitanie
- Coordinates: 43°59′10″N 2°08′31″E
- Country: France
- Region: Occitania
- Department: Tarn
- Arrondissement: Albi
- Canton: Albi-3
- Intercommunality: Carmausin-Ségala

Government
  - Mayor (2026–32): Patrice Norkowski
- Area^{1}: 24.7 km^{2} (9.5 sq mi)
- Elevation: 230 m (750 ft)
- Highest elevation: 324 m (1,063 ft)
- Lowest elevation: 153 m (502 ft)
- Population (2023): 2,621
  - Density: 106/km^{2} (275/sq mi)
- Time zone: UTC+01:00 (CET)
  - Summer (DST): UTC+02:00 (CEST)
- INSEE/Postal code: 81048 /81130
- ^{1} French Land Register data, which excludes lakes, ponds, glaciers > 1 km^{2} (0.386 sq mi or 247 acres) and river estuaries.

Cagnac-les-Mines (French pronunciation: [kaɲak le min]; Occitan: Canhac de las Minas) is a commune in the southern French department of Tarn.

It is a former coal-mining town for workers of the Compagnie minière de Carmaux, and has a mining museum.

Exposed to a modified oceanic climate, it is drained by the Vère, the Mouline stream, and several other small waterways.

Cagnac-les-Mines is a rural commune with a population of 2,621 (as of 2023). It is part of the Albi metropolitan area. Its inhabitants are called Cagnacois or Cagnacoises.

== Geography ==
As part of the Albi area of attraction, the commune is located between Albi and Carmaux in the Albigeois region.

=== Neighboring communes ===
Cagnac-les-Mines shares borders with seven other communes. These neighboring communes are Albi, Castelnau-de-Lévis, Le Garric, Lescure-d'Albigeois, Mailhoc, Sainte-Croix and Taïx.

=== Geology and relief ===
The area of the commune is 2,470 hectares; its altitude varies from 153 to 324 meters.

=== Hydrography ===
The town is bordered to the north by the Vère River, on which an embankment dam, (Note: An embankment dam is a dam made of loose material, whether very fine or very coarse (rockfill), whose own mass is sufficient to oppose the pressure exerted by the water.) 330 meters wide at the walls, 15 meters high, 1.4 kilometers long, covering 33 hectares and with a maximum capacity of 1.21 million cubic meters, was commissioned in 1998. The Fourogue structure, also called the Fonroque reservoir by the French National Geographic Institute (IGN), named after the locality of Fonroque north of the town, was built on the upper reaches of the Vère. This dam, whose purpose, according to its developer, was to maintain low water levels with a flow of 11 liters/second and to support irrigation with a flow of 280 liters/second, was constructed by the Compagnie d'Aménagement des Coteaux de Gascogne (CACG) in 1997-1998. Despite being condemned by the administrative court, the works were carried out to completion, and the various initiatives taken by the administrative and judicial authorities failed to stop them. Since then, the reservoir, which extends across the communes of Mailhoc and Cagnac-les-Mines, has been managed entirely illegally.

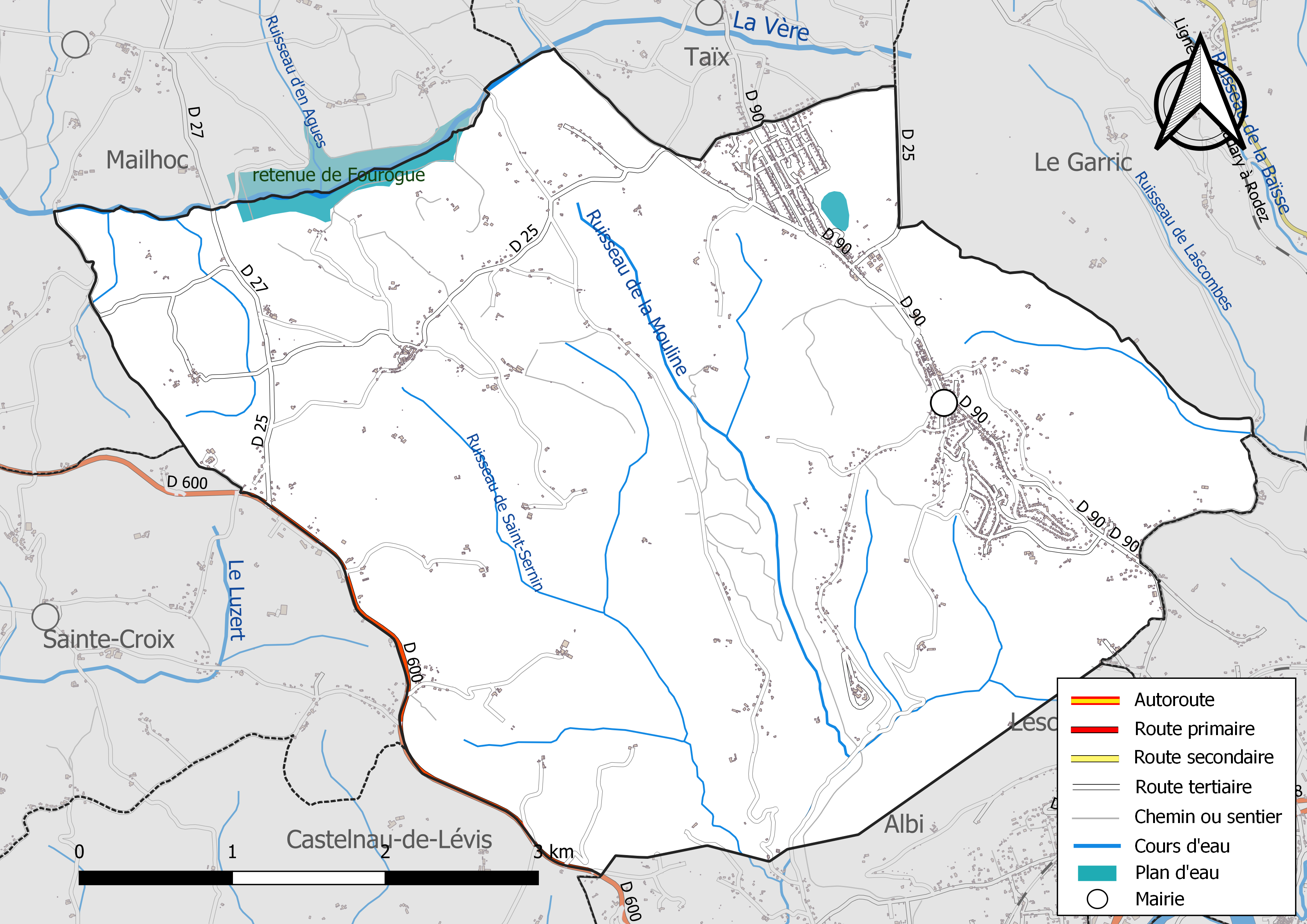
Hydrographic and road networks of Cagnac-les-Mines

== Urban planning ==
=== Typology ===
As of January 1, 2024, Cagnac-les-Mines is categorized as a rural commune with dispersed housing, according to the new seven-level municipal population density scale defined by INSEE in 2022. It is located outside an urban area. Furthermore, the commune is part of the Albi catchment area, of which it is a peripheral commune. (Note: The concept of urban catchment area replaced the old concept of urban area in October 2020, to allow for consistent comparisons with other countries in the European Union.) This area, which includes 91 communes, is categorized as having a population between 50,000 and 200,000.

=== Land use ===
Land cover in the commune, as shown in the European biophysical land cover database Corine Land Cover (CLC), is characterized by the significant presence of agricultural land (68.2% in 2018), a decrease compared to 1990 (69.8%). The detailed breakdown in 2018 is as follows: arable land (41%), forests (21.1%), heterogeneous agricultural areas (19.7%), grasslands (7.5%), areas with shrub and/or herbaceous vegetation (4.8%), urbanized areas (4.5%), industrial or commercial areas and communication networks (1.1%), inland waters (Note: Continental waters refer to all surface waters, generally fresh waters originating from rainwater, that are found inland.) (0.4%). The evolution of land use in the commune and its infrastructure can be observed on the different cartographic representations of the territory: the Cassini map (18th century), the general staff map (1820-1866) and the maps or aerial photos of the IGN for the current period (1950 to today).

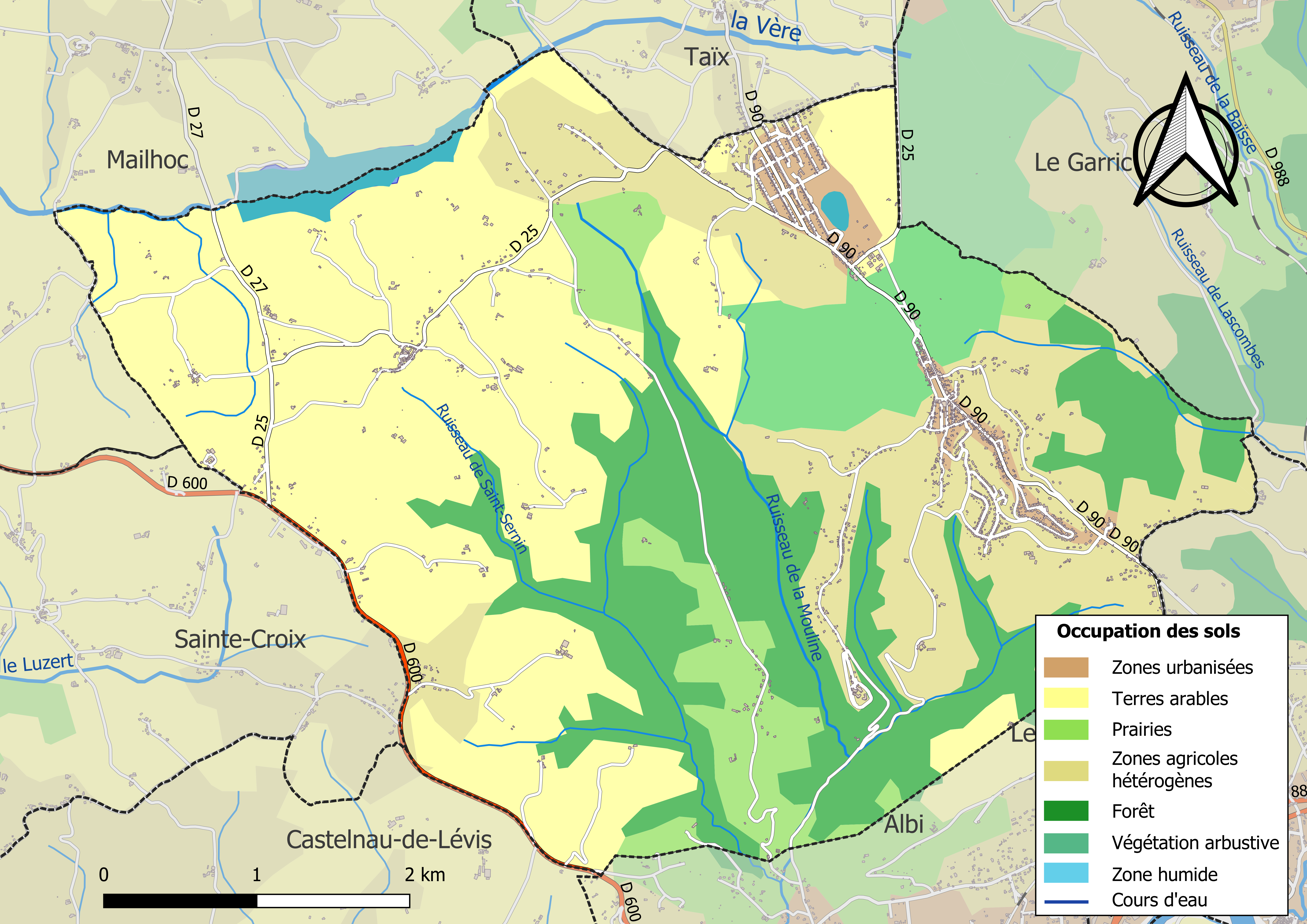
Map of infrastructure and land use in the commune in 2018 (CLC)

== Name ==
The ending -(i)ac, derived from the Gaulish suffix -(i)acum, defines either a place, a geographical feature, or the former site of a Gallo-Roman villa. The first element, Cagn-, represents the Latin personal name Canius, which is superimposed on the Gaulish common noun cano- "reed," likely also used as a personal name.

The place names Drignac and Prunac also date from this Gallic and Gallo-Roman period, as well as various hydronyms and microtoponyms such as Vère, from the ancient root ver (vera, varia "watercourse"); Bounès, from the ancient root bornà; Bars, from the ancient root bar (barros "head" → place names barro- "height," cf. Old Irish barr "summit, peak, point, end," Welsh bar "summit"); Cassagnes "oak wood, oak grove," from the ancient root cassanos "oak" + the suffix -ia, etc. Other place names are formed from personal names such as La Ruffigné (la Rufinià), from the personal name Rufin, etc.

The additional qualifier les-Mines refers to the Campgrand mine shafts (now the Mining Museum).

== History ==
=== The origins of the commune ===
The hamlet of Cagnac-le-Vieux, which can be located near the Campgrand pits (now the Cagnac mining museum), to the southwest (see plot 284 on the cadastral plan below), consists of the old castle and some old houses surrounded by a rampart protected by a ditch and pierced by a single gate.

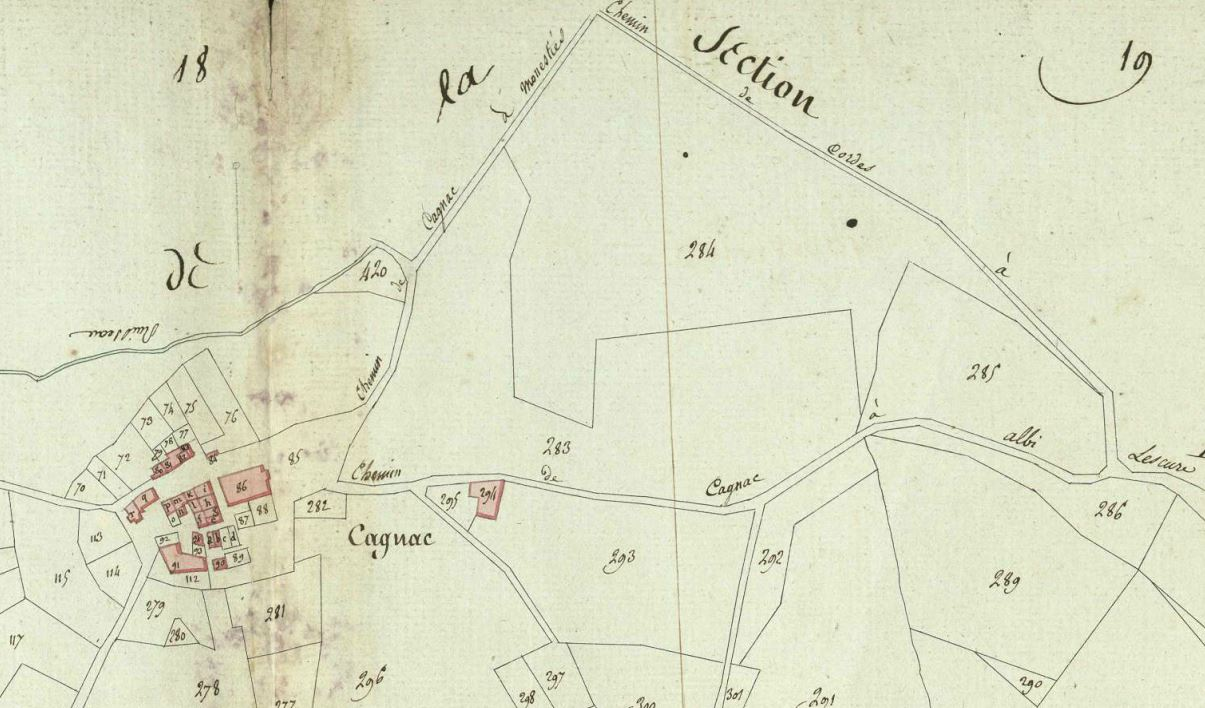
Hamlet of old Cagnac - cadastral map of Castelnau-de-Lévis in 1809.

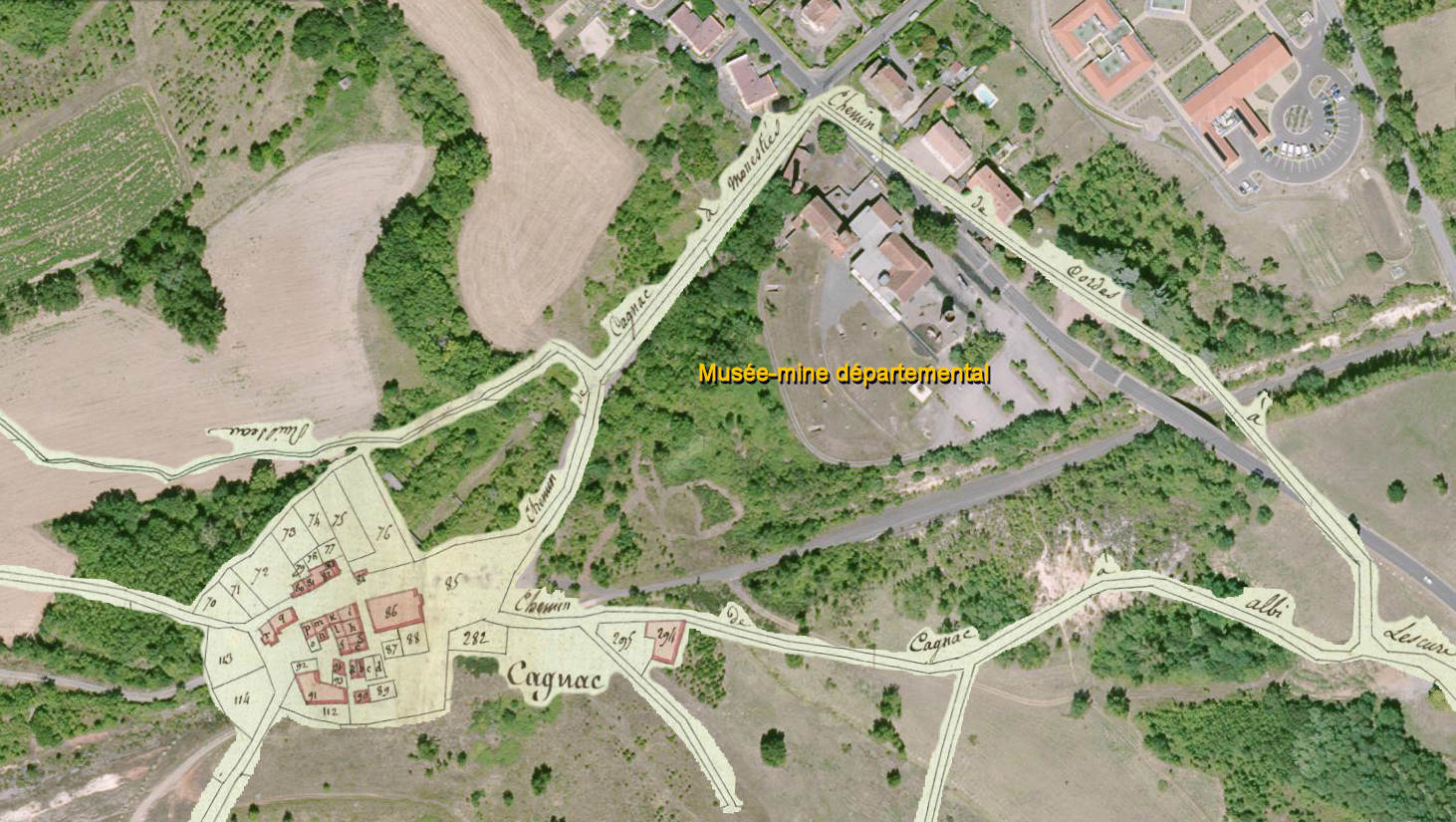
Aerial view of the Mining Museum and cadastral map of old Cagnac.

Here is what the correspondent for the religious weekly newsletter of the Archdiocese of Albi wrote: "Cagnac once had its castle surrounded by old houses, on a hillock whose height was not at all intimidating. Its keep, it seems, rivaled that of Castelnau-de-Lévis and had to bow before its rival; many a quarrel between lords alarmed the peasants. Of this castle and of this old Cagnac, the pickaxe of the demolition crews, not extremely long ago, did away. Not a stone remains upon a stone."

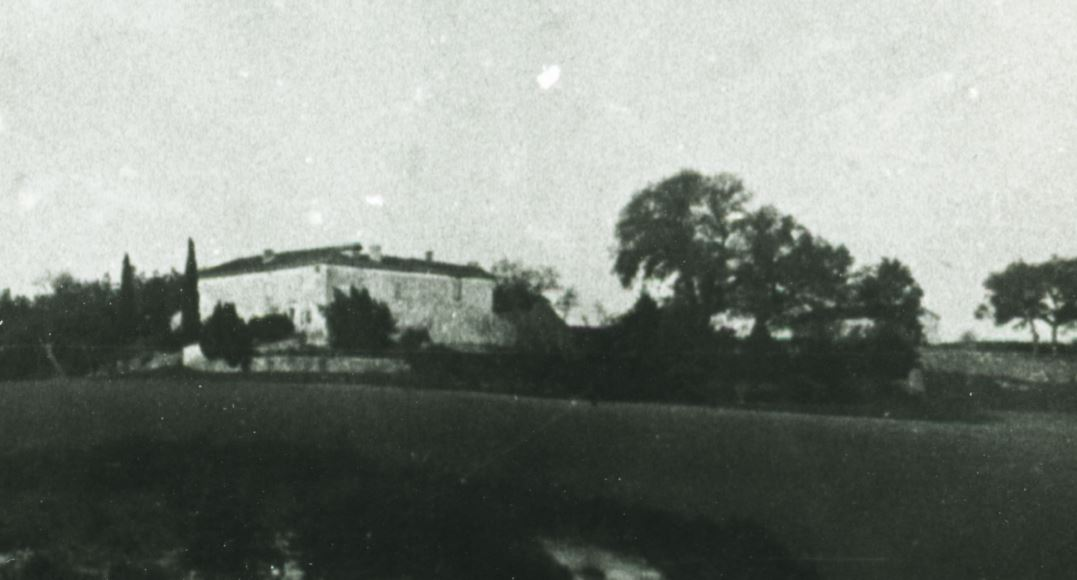
Hamlet of old Cagnac in 1900 with the old castle of the Delpuech lords of Canhac.

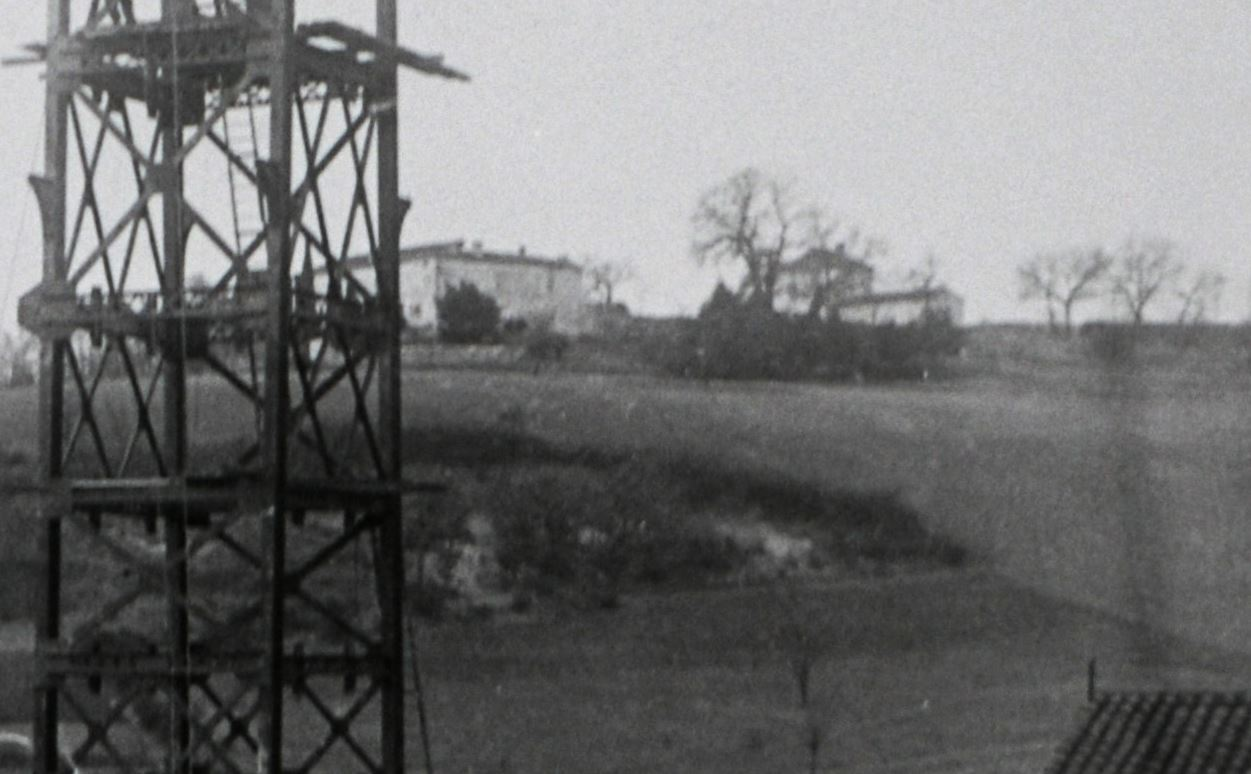
Hamlet of old Cagnac in 1903.

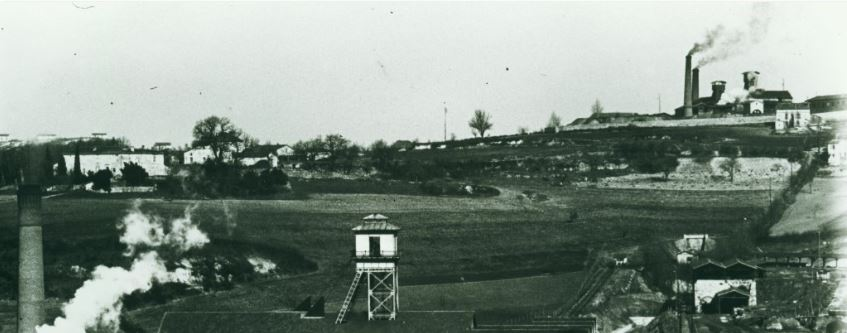
Hamlet of Cagnac (on the left) in 1908 and mine shafts no. 1, 2 and 3.

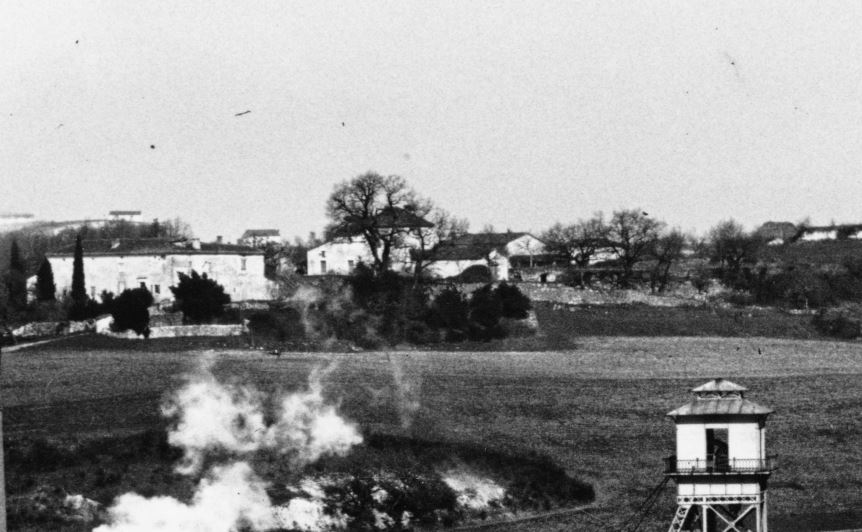
Hamlet of old Cagnac, 1908 (enlargement of the photo).

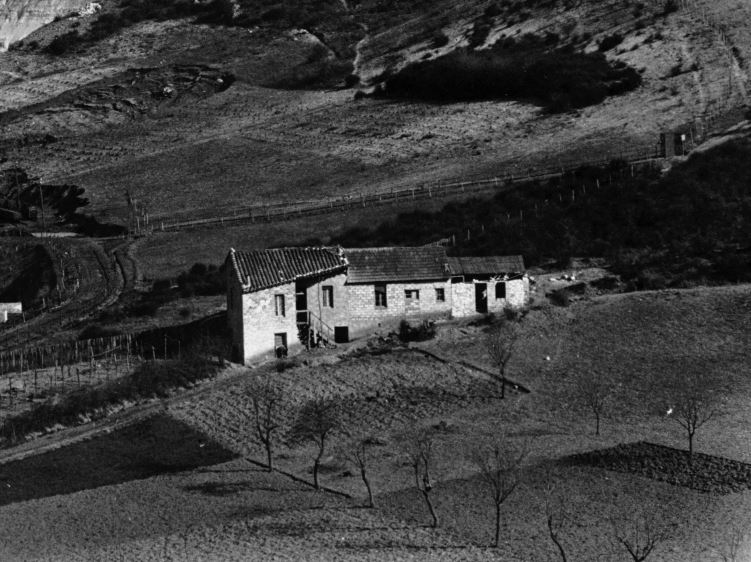
Former farm of Larène in Cagnac, 1908.

The seigneury of Cagnac, which was part of Castelnau-de-Lévis and was separated from it in 1833 to become part of the commune of Saint-Sernin-lès-Mailhoc, a name later replaced by Cagnac-les-Mines. The seigneury belonged to the Del Puech family (du Puy in French) from Pons Delpuech until the 17th century.

Pons is the first known Del Puech of the branch of the lords of Canhac, co-lord of La Bastide-Lévis, lord of Carmaux, etc. In 1260 and 1288, Guillaume, the son of Pons Bernard, distinguished himself by ceding his portion of the tithe from Saint-Dalmaze to the chapter of Sainte Cécile in Albi. The seigneury of Canhac passed to the Roquefeuil family on May 17, 1696, through the marriage of Charlotte Dupuy, niece of Isabeau Dupuy, Lady of Cagnac, to Charles de Roquefeuil, Lord of La Crouzette. It was the couple's third child, Antoine de Roquefeuil, who inherited the title of Lord of Cagnac upon the death of his father, Charles, a title he held until his own death. He was buried on August 6, 1736, in the nearby cemetery of Sainte-Martianne. He was the last Roquefeuil Lord of Cagnac.

=== Attachment to Saint-Sernin-les-Mailhoc ===
Originally, the old village of Cagnac, in the parish of Saint-Dalmaze, belonged to the commune of Castelnau-de-Lévis.

Section A of the Castelnau-de-Lévis land registry, then called Castelnau-de-Bonafous, drawn in 1809, comprises:

- The first subdivision comprises the hamlets of La Soulié and La Sayssié, bordered by the Combecroze, Mouline, and Toumétié streams;
- The second subdivision comprises the hamlets of Les Homps, La Boual, and La Toumétié, bordered by the Toumétié stream and the D25 and D90 roads;
- The third subdivision comprises the small village of Cagnac, the hamlets of Celles, Lagrèze, Larène, La Tour, La Jambounié, La Gorsse, and the church of St-Dalmaze, bordered by the Mouline and Arifonds streams and the D90 road;
- The 4th subdivision comprised the hamlets of La Gorsse, La Maurélié, Bretou, La Baisse (or La Vaysse), Lafon, Drignac, and La Drèche;
- The 5th subdivision comprised the hamlets of Saint-Quintin, Drignac, La Mouline, and Balard, bordered by the streams of La Mouline, La Reillet, La Garriguette, and the Gouty ravine, and to the south, the commune of Albi.

On August 9, 1833, an ordinance attached section A of the Castelnau-de-Lévis land register, including the small village of Cagnac, to the commune of Saint-Sernin-les-Mailhoc.

=== Cagnac becomes the chief town of the commune ===
From 1895 onwards, the new Cagnac was built and rapidly expanded to the southeast of Cagnac-le-Vieux, along the road to Albi. Residents of Cagnac circulated a petition to create a new municipality, separate from that of Saint-Sernin-les-Mailhoc. The elected officials representing Saint-Sernin supported this project, which, however, would reduce their territory. But the 1904 municipal elections gave a majority to the representatives of the Cagnac section, who demanded that the existing municipality be preserved and enlarged with the portions that Le Garric and Lescure had agreed to cede. The minority representatives from Saint-Sernin, a rural community, could not prevent the transfer of the administrative center and archives to Cagnac.

For the enlarged municipality, incorporating the land ceded by Le Garric and Lescure, the decree published in the Official Journal on June 12, 1910, officially changed the name: the municipality of Saint-Sernin-les-Mailhoc became Cagnac. Around 1920, the old castle and the old houses of the hamlet of Cagnac-le-Vieux were acquired by the SMA (Société d'Aménagement du Bassin de l'Arbresle) and demolished to make way for a quarry to supply fill for underground construction projects.

=== Cagnac becomes Cagnac-les-Mines ===
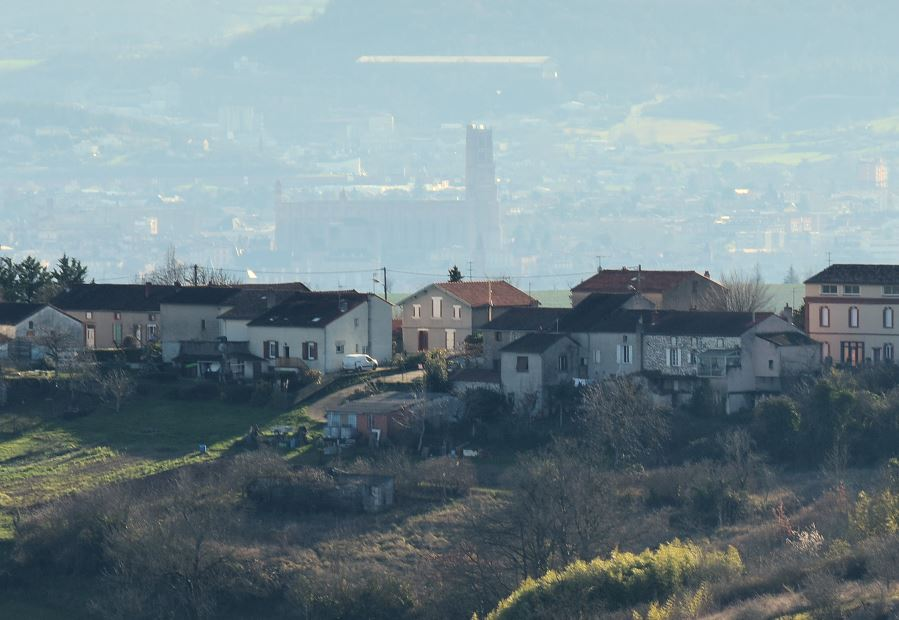
Cagnac-les-Mines and the Sainte-Cécile cathedral of Albi in the distance.

By resolution dated May 25, 1930, the Cagnac municipal council requested that the State authorize the town to be called "Cagnac-les-Mines". The council justified its request by citing mail delivery errors, with mail intended for its residents often being sent to Cagnac and Gagnac in the Lot department, Cognac in the Charente department, and Caignac and Cagnac in the Haute-Garonne department. The change of name would prevent these errors. The name change was approved by decree on February 17, 1931.

== Heraldry ==
Coat of arms of Cagnac-les-Mines	Coat of arms of Cagnac-les-Mines Argent, a miner's axe and pickaxe crossed in saltire, from which hangs a miner's lamp lit in gold, accompanied on the right by a vine branch and on the left by a sheaf of wheat, all proper.

== Religion ==
On October 1, 1907, the archdiocese established a parish and appointed a priest from Tulle, Emmanuel Freyssinet, who would be appointed parish priest of Saint-Privat Church in Carmaux in January 1923. At that time, Cagnac was already a settlement of 1,500 inhabitants, and some worshippers were using the small chapel of Saint-Dalmaze, which quickly proved too small.

In December 1907, the diocese launched a fundraising campaign for the construction of a new place of worship and appealed to generous donors.

The new Sainte-Barbe Church in Cagnac was consecrated on Sunday, March 13, 1910. The correspondent for the bulletin La Semaine religieuse of the Archdiocese of Albi described the ceremony: “The nave is a vast, high rectangular hall with seven bays, seven windows, and a simple wooden floor for a ceiling; it is furnished with two rows of pews. On the whitewashed walls, small paintings of the Stations of the Cross. In the mosaic choir, a beautiful marble high altar, behind which stands out a large crucifix, a painting that all the priests of the diocese will recognize at first glance. The lectern was made by miners from Cagnac. The small bell is the old bell from the chapel of Saint-Alain at the minor seminary of Lavaur. The parish priest of Cagnac turns towards the Archbishop, who rises to listen, and in a clear, vibrant voice, he expresses his gratitude for the great generosity that made the initial construction work possible.”

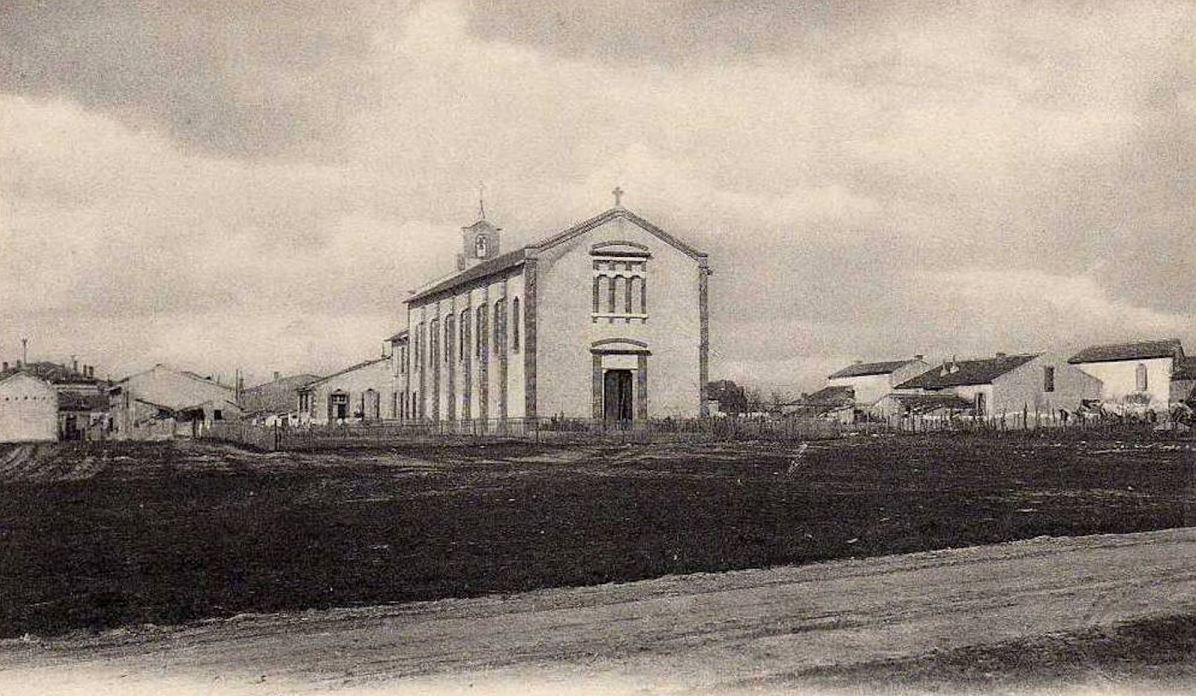
New church of Sainte-Barbe in Cagnac in 1912

Father Freyssinet enlisted at the very beginning of the conflict, with the rank of sergeant in the 122nd Infantry Regiment based in Albi.

General Order No. 53 of the Army: On March 24, 1915, the 2nd and 3rd companies having lost their officers and part of their rank and file, Sergeant Emmanuel Freyssinet was appointed to take command of these units, which he managed to maintain in a very difficult situation, thanks to the admirable example he set and the confidence he instilled in the men. He was promoted to the rank of Second Lieutenant Freyssinet on the battlefield.

In August 1921, he was awarded the French and British Croix de Guerre. In October 1921, the valiant priest of Cagnac was cited in the Army Orders with the following citation: “Freyssinet (Emmanuel), lieutenant in the 122nd Infantry Regiment, after capturing a German listening post with his company on October 6, 1915, only withdrew when ordered to do so; he was the last to leave the post after suffering heavy losses. He retreated step by step, personally firing his weapons after having personally killed several Germans. A model officer, always ready for any act of devotion and sacrifice.”

In January 1916, he was promoted to the rank of Knight of the Legion of Honour. On August 22, 1916, the parish priest of Cagnac was cited in the order of the 62nd Brigade: "Emmanuel Freyssinet, lieutenant and standard-bearer in the 122nd Infantry. Charged with intelligence gathering, liaison by runners, and supplies during the fighting from August 2nd to 11th, 1916, he carried out this threefold mission with tireless courage, energy, and devotion. On August 8th, during a fierce battle, he conducted, without orders, a personal reconnaissance in terrain occupied by enemy groups who had infiltrated our lines, providing information that enabled the direction of a counter-attack which swept the area."

On May 5, 1918, he was again cited in the army order: "In the army order: Lieutenant Emmanuel Freyssinet, after having, with a fine display of daring, taken from..." During the attack, the company he commanded found itself isolated with only five or six men and a machine gun during the ebb and flow of the battle. However, aware that he occupied a strategic point, he held his position all day, keeping an enemy group armed with a machine gun at bay. Reinforced during the night by several men who had joined him, he managed to take another ten prisoners. He was wounded quite seriously in the thigh on May 5th and taken to the rear at the Miséricorde Clinic in Caen. He was promoted to captain.

On March 18, 1921, the official journal announced that Father Jean Louis-Emmanuel Freyssinet, parish priest of Cagnac and former captain in the 122nd Infantry Regiment, had been promoted to Officer of the Legion of Honor.

== Culture and festivities ==
At the end of 1985, the mayor and elected officials of Cagnac-les-Mines, along with former miners, through the CEPACIM association (Centre Éclaté de Promotion des Activités Culturelles – Center for the Promotion of Cultural Activities), created on April 25, 1985, signed an agreement with the coal mining company: "for the use of Shafts 1 and 2 of Cagnac-les-Mines, which would serve as an exhibition space for an industrial tourism circuit then under development."

Six retired miners joined forces within CEPACIM and began collecting machinery, equipment, tools, and other objects from the mine. They then began excavating 350 meters of tunnels, which would form a complete and highly accurate reconstruction of the mine's underground workings for future generations. The tourism circuit attracted more than 17,000 visitors by 1991, including guided tours of the underground tunnels around Shaft 2 of Cagnac-les-Mines.

Today, the Cagnac-les-Mines mining museum is managed by the Tarn departmental conservation office since 2007, which organizes guided tours and is responsible for the conservation and promotion of the tangible and intangible collections and the mining landscape in Cagnac-les-Mines.

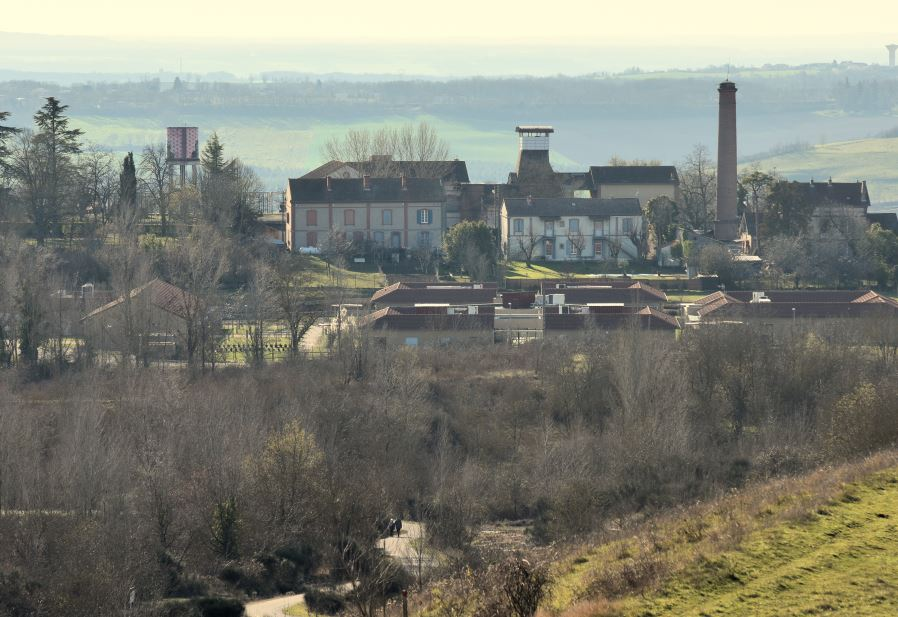
Cagnac-les-Mines Departmental Mining Museum

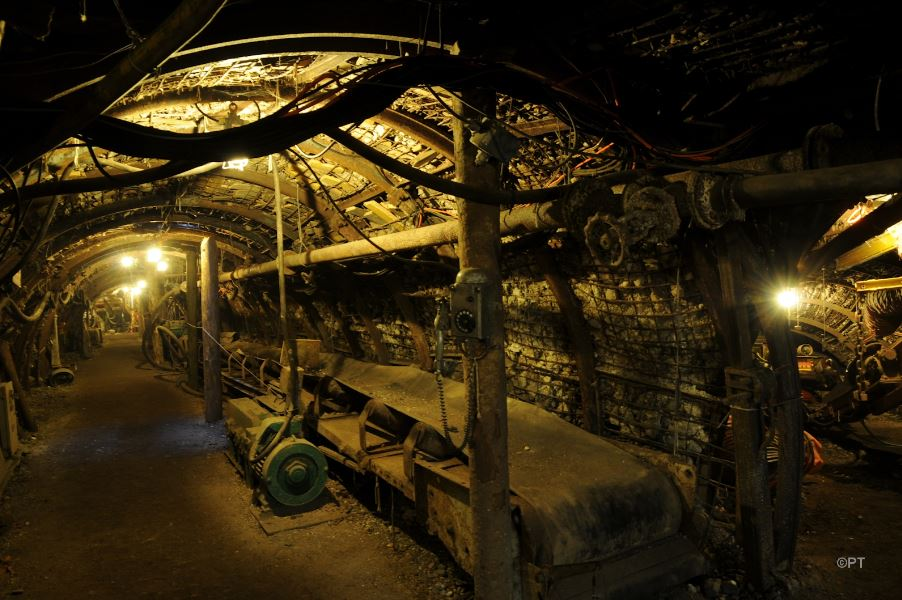
Flow gallery of the Cagnac-les-Mines Departmental Mining Museum

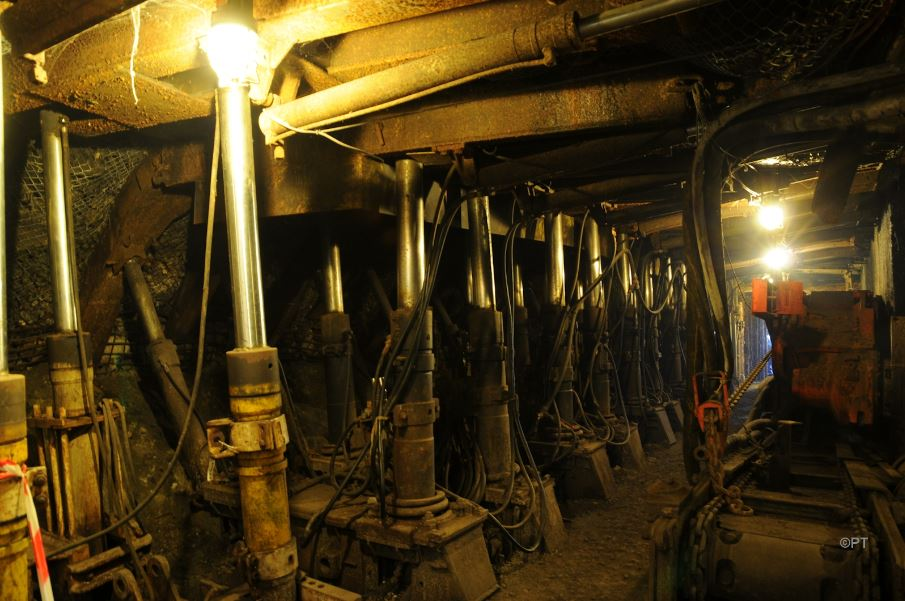
Mechanized cutting with walking hydraulic support and drum-type cutting machine at the Cagnac-les-Mines Departmental Mining Museum

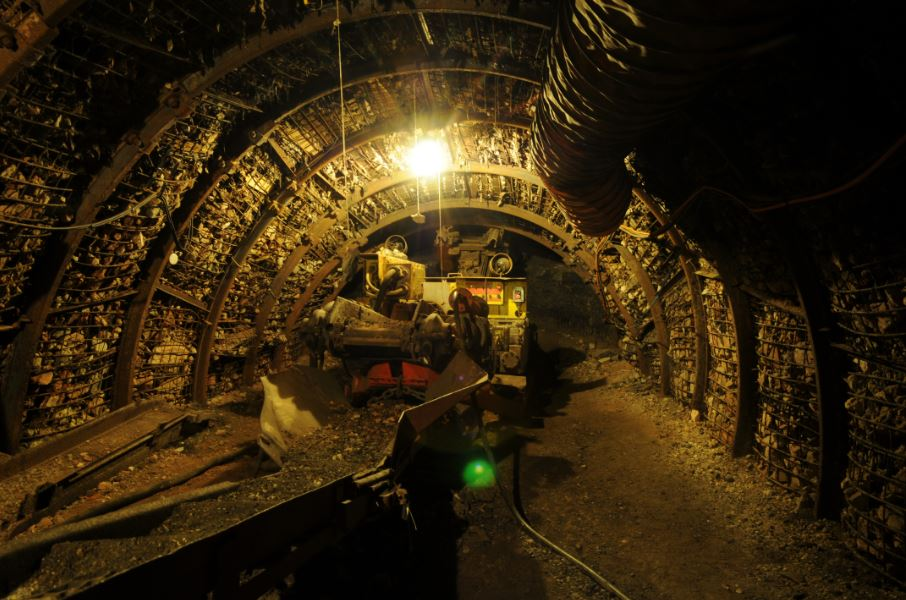
Tracing gallery with Alpine Miner digging machine at the Cagnac-les-Mines Departmental Mining Museum

== Local culture and heritage ==
=== Monuments and sights ===
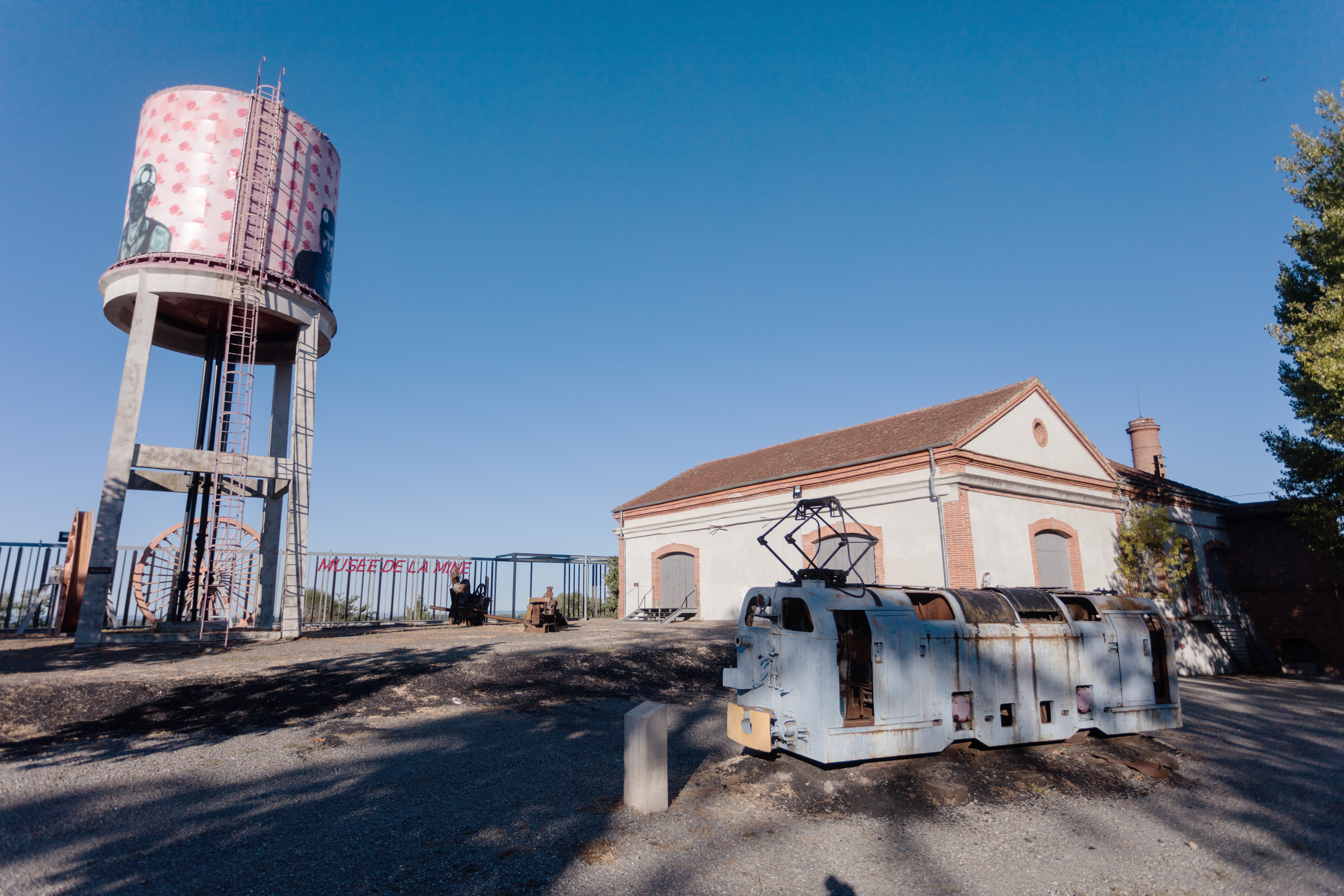
The entrance to the Mining Museum.

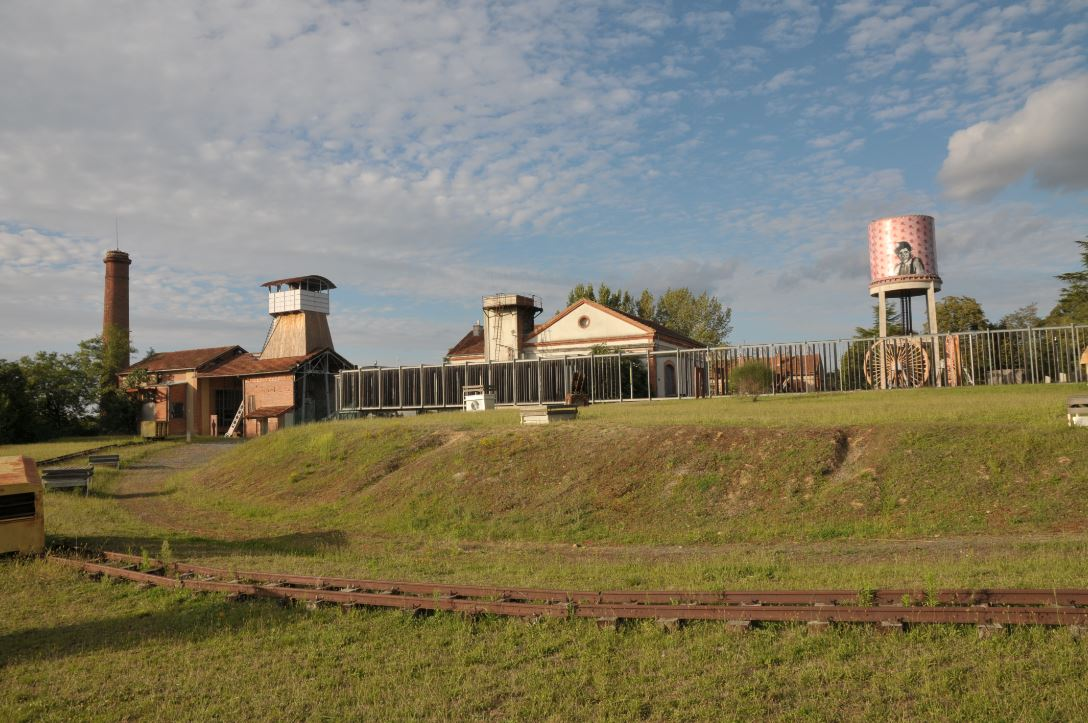
Cagnac-les-Mines Departmental Mining Museum.

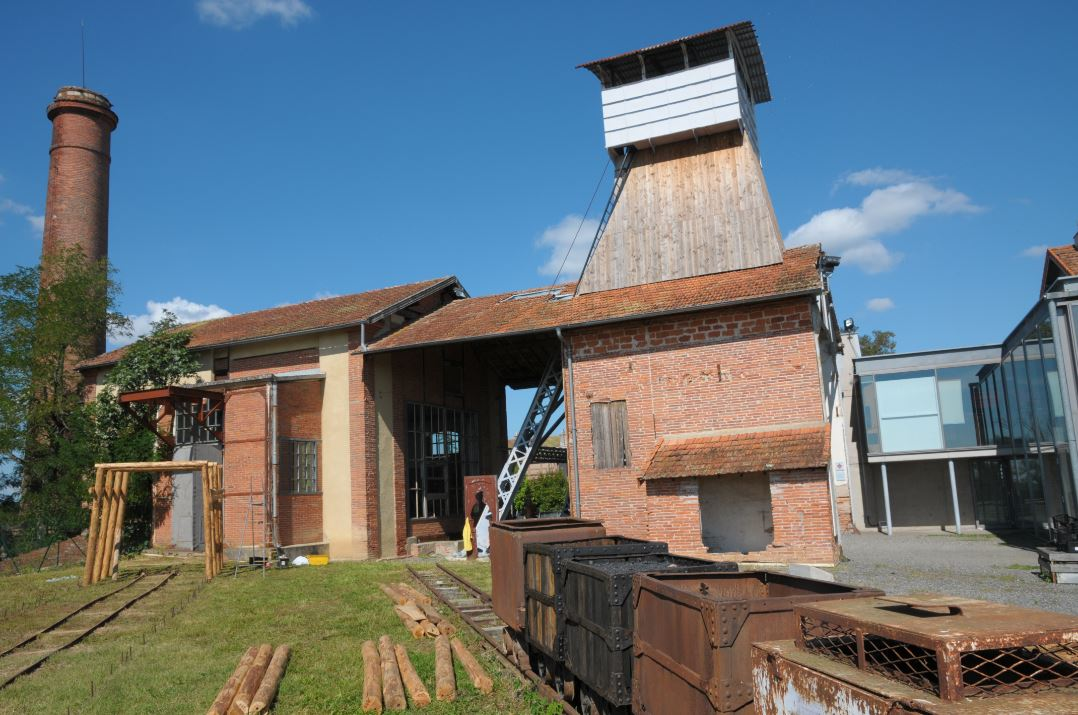
Former shaft no. 2, Cagnac-les-Mines Departmental Mining Museum

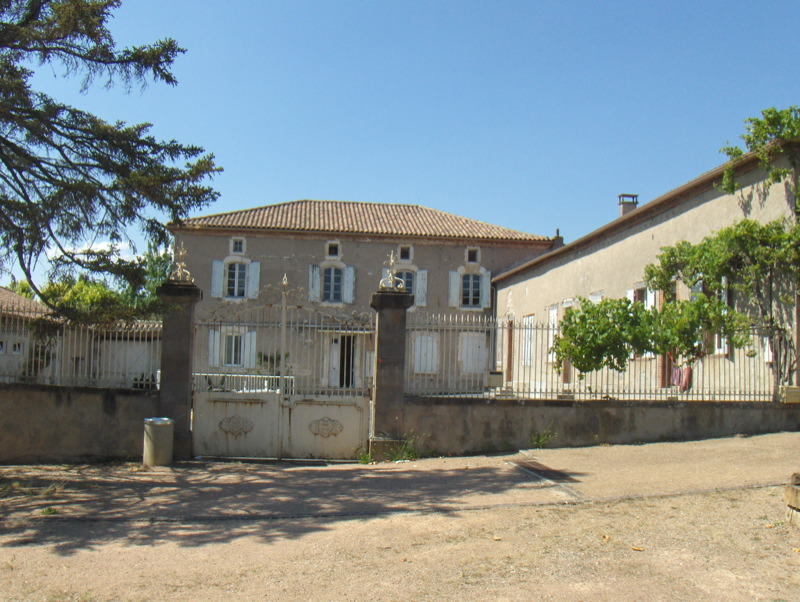
Former school reserved for the children of Poles.
- The departmental mining museum on the old Campgrand mine shafts.
- The Cap'Découverte leisure park.
- The timberman in front of the Polish man's house.
- Notre-Dame-de-la-Drèche Church.
- Saint-Dalmazy Church. The building was listed as a historical monument in 1970.
- Sainte-Barbe Church in Cagnac-les-Mines.
- Saint-Saturnin Church in Saint-Sernin-les-Mailhoc.

=== Château de Cagnac ===
The now-vanished Château de Cagnac was built at an unknown date on a small rise. It originally boasted a large keep, which, before being razed, may even have rivaled that of the nearby Château de Castelnau-de-Lévis in size. The hamlet surrounding the castle was protected by a rampart encircled by a moat and pierced by a single gate.

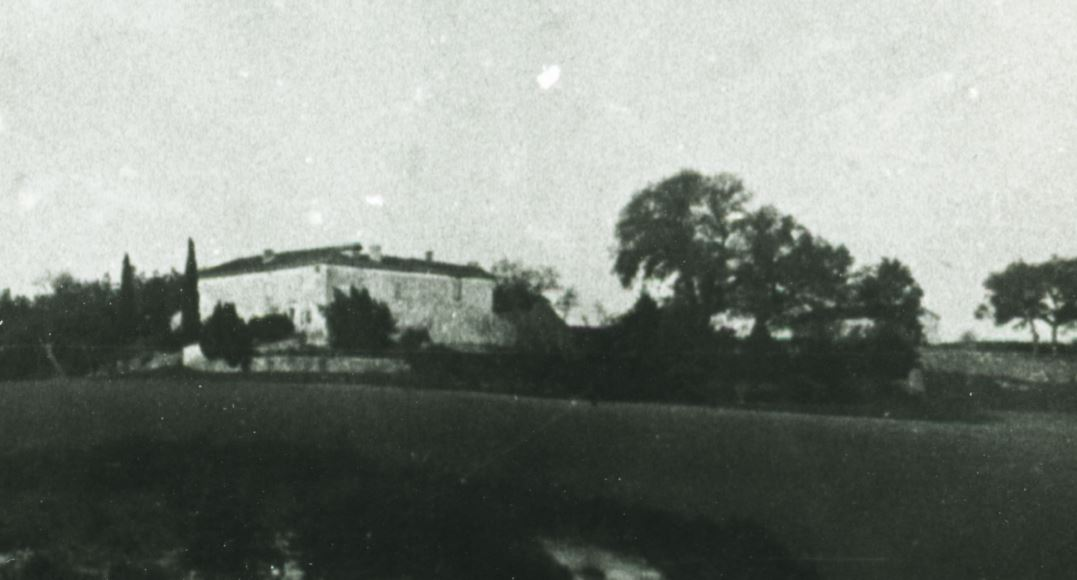
Photo of the castle in 1898

The seigneury of Cagnac belonged to the Delpuech or Dupuy family from the 13th century until 1696, through the marriage of Charlotte Dupuy, niece of Isabeau Dupuy, Lady of Cagnac, to Charles de Roquefeuil. It was almost certainly she who had the original castle built, later remodeled by the Roquefeuil-Anduze family, who acquired it through marriage in 1696 and retained it until 1736.

According to the 1809 land registry, the château in the 19th century was a large east-west oriented rectangle in the center of the hamlet of Vieux Cagnac. In 1865, the historian and magistrate Hippolyte Crozes described it as "disfigured, lacking character." It was finally demolished in the 1920s by the Albi Mining Company, along with the neighboring houses. The site was then used as a quarry to backfill the mines, notably the nearby Campgrand mine.

== Population ==
Historical population
Year	Pop.	±% p.a.
1968	3,378	—
1975	2,818	−2.56%
1982	2,613	−1.07%
1990	2,225	−1.99%
1999	2,086	−0.71%
2007	2,151	+0.38%
2012	2,349	+1.78%
2017	2,601	+2.06%
2023	2,621	+0.13%
Source: INSEE

== See also ==
- Communes of the Tarn department

== Bibliography ==
- Agnès Lazareff, Le Pays des deux terres (Lo Païs de las doas tèrras), preface by Christian-Pierre Bedel, Las Fuèlhas, 1999
- « Les Polonais de Cagnac », Revue du Tarn, No. 269, march 2023
