= Fernand Farssac =

French gendarme and resistance fighter (1902 - 1964)

- Born: 19 August 1902
- Died: 26 February 1964
- Awards: Righteous Among the Nations (2003, France)

Fernand Farssac (April 19, 1902 – February 26, 1964), nicknamed "Toutyva", was a French gendarme, a resistance fighter, and Righteous Among the Nations. During World War II, he saved dozens of Jews who had taken refuge in Lautrec before joining the maquis. He then organized and trained the rescued Jews, establishing a resistance network with them in the Tarn before dispersing them into the surrounding maquis.

In total, Farssac is believed to have saved nearly 80 Jews.

== Biography ==
Fernand Emile Justin Alexandre Farssac was born on April 19, 1902, in Le Garric. His father, Auguste Farssac, was a miner, and his mother, Marie-Julienne née Fenouillet, did not have an occupation listed. In 1924, he married Ernestine, née Fournier, and they had a son, Gérard Farssac.

=== World War II ===
As an adjutant and later a brigadier-chef, he was the head of the gendarmerie in Lautrec.

During the Occupation, starting in 1940, Farssac developed friendly relations with the Rural Camp of the Jewish Scouts of France. He refused deportation orders and decided to hide the dozens of adolescents present there. Farssac successfully thwarted the Gestapo's attempts locally, hiding Jewish adolescents at least five times. Alongside these protective activities, he established the Toutyva maquis, named after his war pseudonym. Farssac spied on the Germans by wiretapping their telegraphic communications, with his son also involved in rescue operations. For instance, on the night of June 9, 1943, they urgently coordinated to hide Jews from an imminent Gestapo raid.

After some time protecting them, he reported himself as ill and went into hiding with his son, Gérard. He then trained the Jewish adolescents to join various maquis, training more than 70 of them. He also received parachute drops and relayed them to the maquis.

In total, he is credited with saving approximately 80 Jews.

== Legacy ==
In 2003, Yad Vashem awarded him the title of Righteous Among the Nations in recognition of his actions during the Holocaust. In 2015, Lautrec organized a municipal tribute to Fernand Farssac. In 2018, a plaque bearing his name was unveiled in Lautrec. In 2023, his life was the focus of an exhibition at the Graulhet gendarmerie barracks.

His son testified on his behalf, particularly to students and high schoolers. In 2024, the 59th class of the Officer School of Gendarmerie in Tulle was named "Fernand Farssac".
