= Milhavet =

- Commune
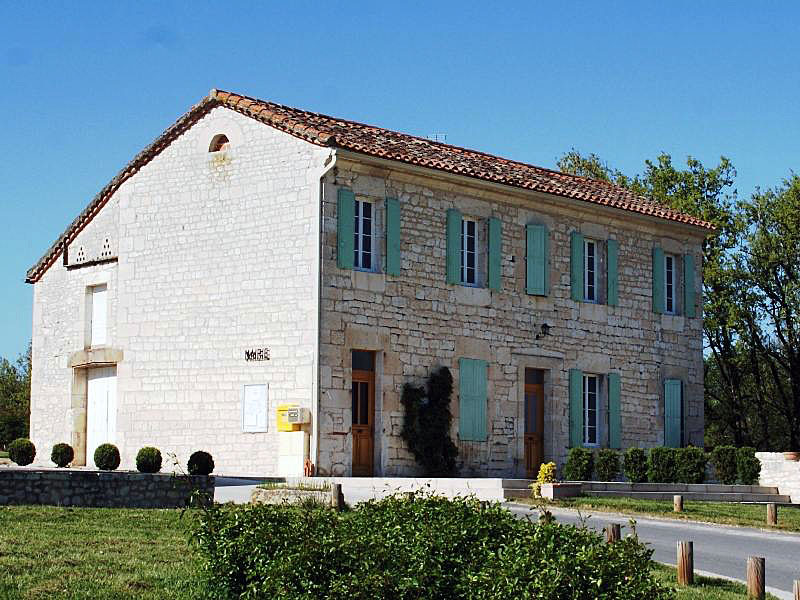

- Coat of arms
- Location of Milhavet
- Location within France Location within Occitanie
- Coordinates: 44°01′48″N 2°01′39″E
- Country: France
- Region: Occitania
- Department: Tarn
- Arrondissement: Albi
- Canton: Albi-3

Government
  - Mayor (2020–2026): Thierry Calmels
- Area^{1}: 4.28 km^{2} (1.65 sq mi)
- Elevation: 278 m (912 ft)
- Highest elevation: 322 m (1,056 ft)
- Lowest elevation: 255 m (837 ft)
- Population (2023): 102
  - Density: 23.8/km^{2} (61.7/sq mi)
- Time zone: UTC+01:00 (CET)
  - Summer (DST): UTC+02:00 (CEST)
- INSEE/Postal code: 81166 /81130
- ^{1} French Land Register data, which excludes lakes, ponds, glaciers > 1 km^{2} (0.386 sq mi or 247 acres) and river estuaries.

Milhavet (French pronunciation: [mijavɛ]) is a commune in the Tarn department in southern France.

== See also ==
- Communes of the Tarn department
