= Villeneuve-sur-Vère =

- Commune
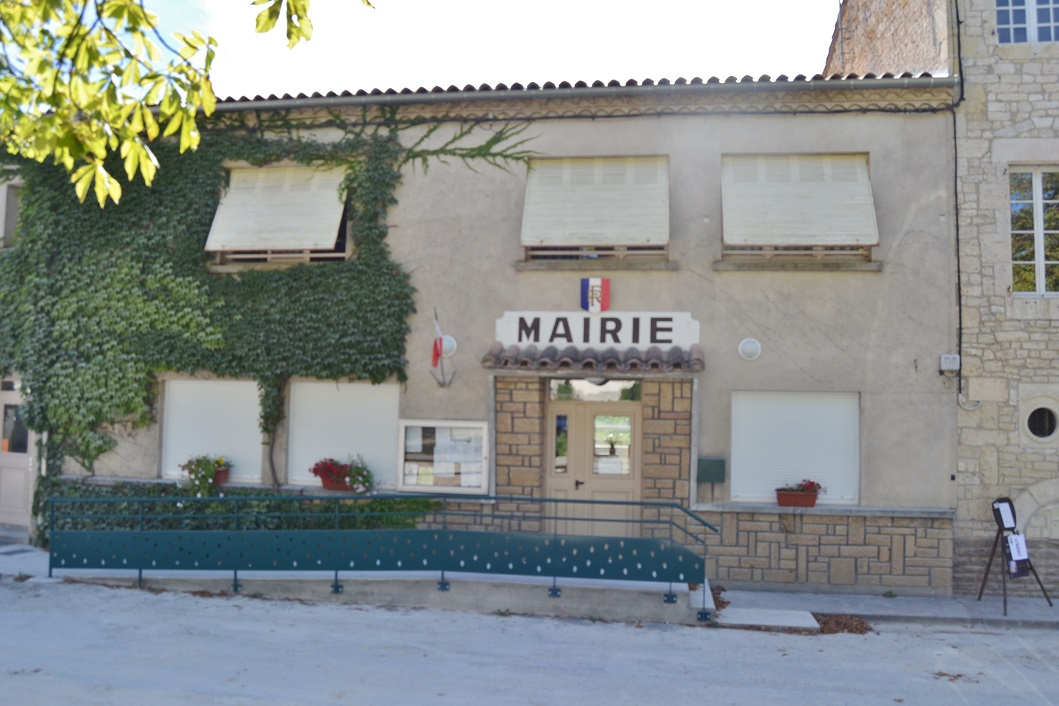
- Town hall

- Coat of arms
- Location of Villeneuve-sur-Vère
- Location within France Location within Occitanie
- Coordinates: 44°00′11″N 2°01′45″E
- Country: France
- Region: Occitania
- Department: Tarn
- Arrondissement: Albi
- Canton: Albi-3

Government
  - Mayor (2020–2026): Alain Trouche
- Area^{1}: 15.89 km^{2} (6.14 sq mi)
- Highest elevation: 321 m (1,053 ft)
- Lowest elevation: 227 m (745 ft)
- Population (2023): 528
  - Density: 33.2/km^{2} (86.1/sq mi)
- Time zone: UTC+01:00 (CET)
  - Summer (DST): UTC+02:00 (CEST)
- INSEE/Postal code: 81319 /81130
- ^{1} French Land Register data, which excludes lakes, ponds, glaciers > 1 km^{2} (0.386 sq mi or 247 acres) and river estuaries.

Villeneuve-sur-Vère (French pronunciation: [vilnœv syʁ vɛʁ]; Occitan: Vilanòva de Vera) is a commune in the Tarn department in southern France.

== History ==
In the beginning of the 13th century, those who survived the Crusade of Simon de Montfort created a Bastide in the east side of fort Alemanni, named Bastide of Mount Alaman or in Doat. Later, in 1212, this Bastide was renamed Villeneuve by Déodat Alaman, who was the new founder. The new fortified town was built on a ledge with a view to the Vère River. The Archdiocese of Albi comprised the whole of the department of Tarn. Villeneuve-sur-Vere belonged to the Archbishop of Albi, until 1479. Then the lordship was acquired by Louis d'Amboise, who became the new bishop of Albi.

== Geography ==
The village lies in the middle of the commune, on the left bank of the Vère, which flows westward through the commune.

== See also ==
- Communes of the Tarn department
- Search for Villeneuve-sur-Vere at the John Reps Bastides Collection, Cornell University Library
