= Lautrec pink garlic =

Type of French garlic

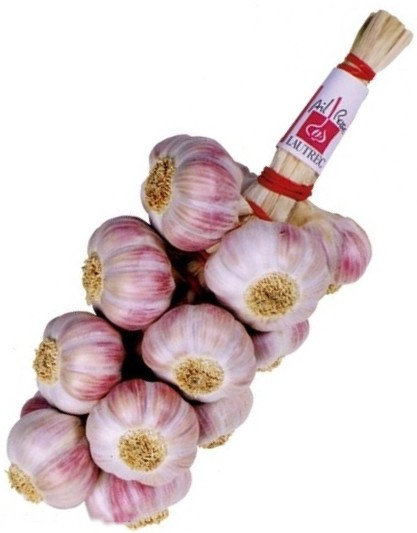
Manouille of the garlic.

Lautrec pink garlic is a protected geographical indication indicating a specific production of garlic from the Lautrec commune in the Tarn department in southern France.

This crop has been, since 1966, listed under the French Label Rouge ail rose (pink garlic) and under the protected geographical indication ail rose de Lautrec (Lautrec pink garlic) since June 12, 1996.

== Characteristics ==
Lautrec pink garlic is characterized by its pink tunicas, its extended dormancy (allowing its delayed marketing until spring) and by its rigid floral stem, which prevents the braiding for distribution of traditional garlic; instead, the garlic is bound into clusters called "manouilles". This rigid floral stem is pruned early in the growing season in a process known as despoulinage, a local word meaning castration, the better to concentrate growth and flavour in the underground bulbs.

The garlic has a highly developed flavor. Due to the extended drying time (a minimum of 15 days), it is well-suited to long-term storage.

== Geographical delimitation ==
The geographical area of production of Lautrec pink garlic has been defined taking into account the historical traditions of cultivation and the characteristics of the terroir. It consists of 88 communes in the western part of the Tarn, in a region with clay and limestone soils, watered by the Agout and Dadou rivers.

== History ==
The pink garlic has been popular in Lautrec since the Middle Ages. Stories are told of a wandering merchant who was unable to pay for his meal at a local tavern; he settled his bill with a mysterious pink garlic. The surprised tavern owner decided to plant it and the pink garlic has been common to the area ever since.
