= 2009 Sidecarcross World Championship =

Motorcycle race in 2009

Season
- Grands Prix: 13
- Duration: 29 March–13 September

Drivers
- Champions: (Belgium) Joris Hendrickx (Latvia) Kaspars Liepiņš
- Sidecarcross des Nations: Belgium

The 2009 FIM Sidecarcross world championship, the 30th edition of the competition, started on 29 March and finished after thirteen race weekends on 13 September 2009.

After six championships in a row for Daniël Willemsen, the 2009 edition was won by Joris Hendrickx from Belgium. His passenger, Kaspars Liepiņš, is from Latvia.

Parallel to the riders competition, a manufacturers championship was also held and won by Vruwink MotorCycles - VMC.

== Overview ==
Locations of Grand Prix in the 2009 Sidecarcross world championship

The 2009 season was the 30th edition of the sidecarcross world championship. The defending champion was Daniël Willemsen from the Netherlands. He started the season with a new passenger, having parted with the Swiss Reto Grütter, whom he won the 2007 and 2008 title with. After 17 seasons in the sidecarcross world championship, former five-time world champion Kristers Sergis had announced his retirement from the competition, having finished his career with a second place in the 2008 edition. Another former world champion to retire from the competition was Marcel Willemsen, but he did still take part in one more Grand Prix during the season. With Kaspars Stupelis and Sven Verbrugge, two riders who had won world championships as passengers with Daniël Willemsen also took part in the competition, the later reunited with Willemsen in a team.

The thirteen races of the season were held in eleven countries, Switzerland, France, Belgium, Ukraine, Netherlands, Latvia, Estonia, Russia, Denmark, Poland and Germany. It was the first time since 2001, that the championship had returned to the traditional sidecarcross nation of Switzerland. Russia was on the calendar only for the second time, the previous race having been scheduled to be held in Moscow in 2004 but being cancelled because of heavy rain. Poland hosted a race for the first time. The competition however did not return to Great Britain who held its last event in 2001.

== Format ==
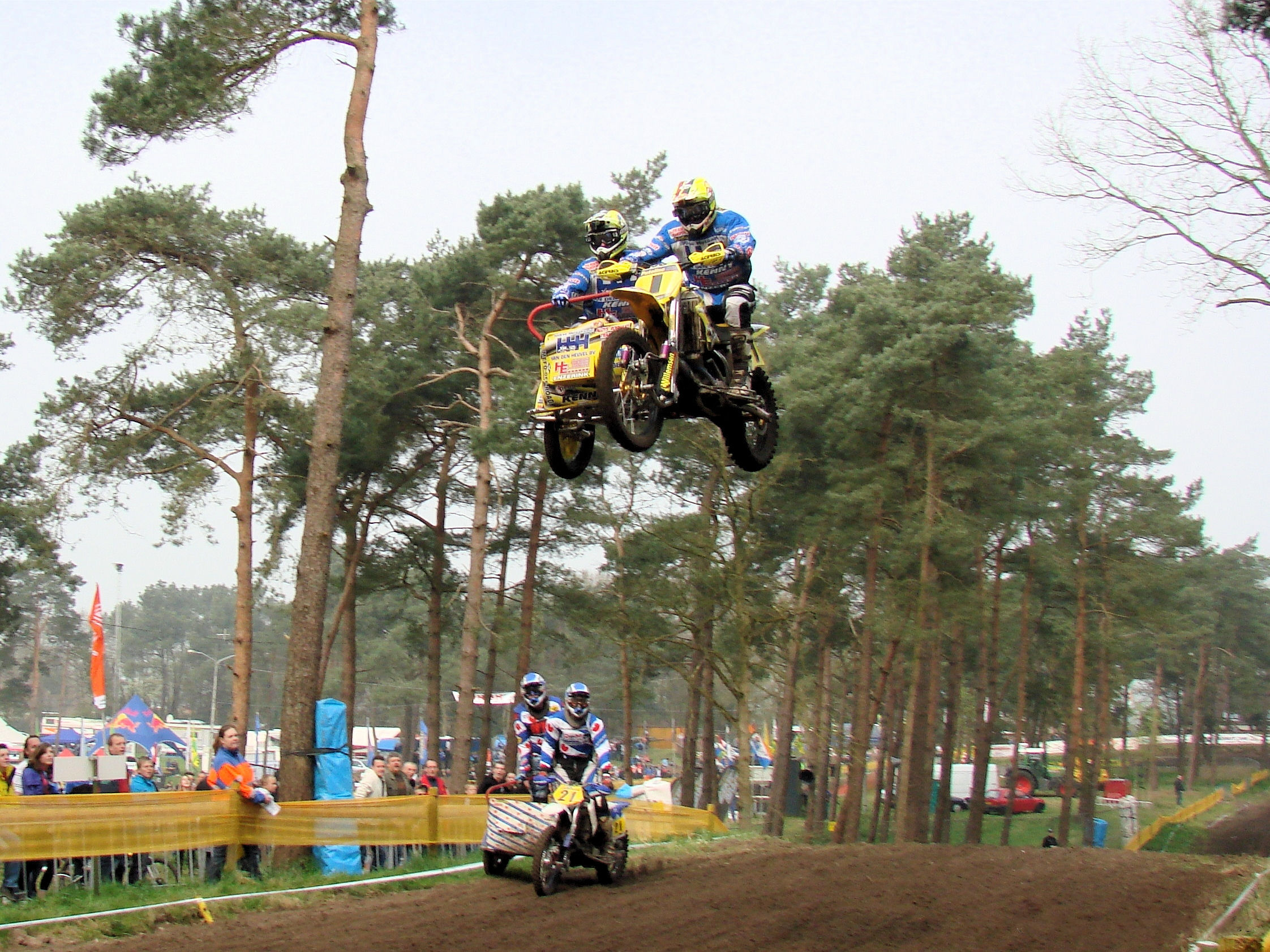
The multiple champion Daniël Willemsen in action

Every Grand Prix weekend is split into two races, both held on the same day. Thus the 2011 season with its thirteen Grand Prix had 26 races. Each race lasts for 30 minutes plus two laps. The two races on a weekend get combined to determine an overall winner. In case of a tie, the results of the second race are used to determine the winner. While this overall winner receives no extra WC points, they usually are awarded a special trophy. Race start times are set at 13:30 and 16:00.

Events typically consist of a qualifying competition, held in multiple stages on Saturdays of a race weekend while the two race events are typically held on Sundays. One exception to this rule is Easter weekends, when the races are held on Easter Monday. Race weekends can consist of additional motocross or quart support races as well, but the FIM stipulates that the World Championship races have priority. Riders have to be provided with at least one 30-minute free practice season, which will be timed. A race can consist of up to 30 starters and the qualifying modus is dependent on the number of entries. With up to 32 entries, it will be held in one group split into two sessions of 30 minutes each. Above 32 entries, the starter field will be sub-divided into two groups through ballot and the current standings. Each qualifying group can consist of up to 30 racers. Should there be more than 60 entries, a pre-qualifying has to be held. Of the riders in the two groups, the top twelve directly qualify for the races. The remaining teams then go to a second-chance qualifying, in which the best six advance. The riders placed seventh and eighth remain in reserve should one of the qualified teams not be able to participate.

The FIM stipulates that all drivers must be of a minimum age of 18 while passengers have to be at least 16 years old to compete, but no older than 50. Riders older than 50 have to provide a certificate of medical fitness to be permitted to compete. The driver has the right to exchange his passenger under certain conditions.

Starting numbers for the season are awarded according to the previous season's overall finishing position of the driver. Current or former World Champions have however the right to pick any number they wish, except the number one, which is reserved for the current World Champion.

The competition is open for motor cycles with two-stroke engines from between 350 and 750 cc and four-stroke engines of up to 1,000 cc. Each team is permitted the use of two motorcycles with the possibility of changing machines between races.

The FIM does not permit radio communication between riders and their teams. Outside assistance during the race on the course is not permitted unless it is through race marshals in the interest of safety. Limited repairs in the designated repair zone during the race are permitted.

The first twenty teams of each race score competition points. The point system for the 2009 season was as follows:

Place	Points
1	25
2	22
3	20
4	18
5	16
6	15
7	14
8	13
9	12
10	11

Place	Points
11	10
12	9
13	8
14	7
15	6
16	5
17	4
18	3
19	2
20	1

== Prize money ==
Prize money and travel reimbursements in the sport are not large, sidecarcross still qualifying mostly as an amateur sport. In the 2009 season for example, every team received Euro 500 as a travel indemnity per race weekend qualified for. Additionally, prize money was paid, with the winner earning €300, the second placed team €250, the third placed team €200. With the prize money gradually dropping off from there, the teams placed twelfth to twentieth still received €50 each.

== Calendar ==
The calendar for the 2009 season:

Date	Place	Race winners	GP winner	Source
29 March	(France) Castelnau	(Netherlands) Daniël Willemsen / (Belgium) Dagwin Sabbe	(Belgium) Jan Hendrickx / Tim Smeuninx	Result
29 March	(France) Castelnau	(Belgium) Jan Hendrickx / Tim Smeuninx	(Belgium) Jan Hendrickx / Tim Smeuninx	Result
3 May	(Switzerland) Wohlen	(Netherlands) Daniël Willemsen / (Belgium) Sven Verbrugge	(Netherlands) Daniël Willemsen / (Belgium) Sven Verbrugge	Result
3 May	(Switzerland) Wohlen	(Netherlands) Daniël Willemsen / (Belgium) Sven Verbrugge	(Netherlands) Daniël Willemsen / (Belgium) Sven Verbrugge	Result
17 May	(Poland) Gdańsk	(Netherlands) Daniël Willemsen / (Belgium) Sven Verbrugge	(Netherlands) Daniël Willemsen / (Belgium) Sven Verbrugge	Result
17 May	(Poland) Gdańsk	(Netherlands) Daniël Willemsen / (Belgium) Sven Verbrugge	(Netherlands) Daniël Willemsen / (Belgium) Sven Verbrugge	Result
24 May	(Ukraine) Chernivtsi	(Netherlands) Daniël Willemsen / (Belgium) Sven Verbrugge	(Netherlands) Daniël Willemsen / (Belgium) Sven Verbrugge	Result
24 May	(Ukraine) Chernivtsi	(Netherlands) Daniël Willemsen / (Belgium) Sven Verbrugge	(Netherlands) Daniël Willemsen / (Belgium) Sven Verbrugge	Result
7 June	(Netherlands) Varsseveld	(Netherlands) Daniël Willemsen / (Belgium) Sven Verbrugge	(Netherlands) Daniël Willemsen / (Belgium) Sven Verbrugge	Result
7 June	(Netherlands) Varsseveld	(Netherlands) Daniël Willemsen / (Belgium) Sven Verbrugge	(Netherlands) Daniël Willemsen / (Belgium) Sven Verbrugge	Result
12 July	(Belgium) Genk	(Germany) Marko Happich / (Switzerland) Martin Betschart	(Germany) Marko Happich / (Switzerland) Martin Betschart	Result
12 July	(Belgium) Genk	(Latvia) Janis Daiders / Lauris Daiders	(Germany) Marko Happich / (Switzerland) Martin Betschart	Result
19 July	(Germany) S'bessenbach	(Latvia) Jānis Daiders / Lauris Daiders	(Belgium) Joris Hendrickx / (Latvia) Kaspars Liepiņš	Result
19 July	(Germany) S'bessenbach	(Belgium) Joris Hendrickx / (Latvia) Kaspars Liepins	(Belgium) Joris Hendrickx / (Latvia) Kaspars Liepiņš	Result
26 July	(Denmark) Slagelse	(Belgium) Jan Hendrickx / Tim Smeuninx	(Sweden) Henrik Söderqvist / Tobias Sylwan	Result
26 July	(Denmark) Slagelse	(Sweden) Henrik Söderqvist / Tobias Sylwan	(Sweden) Henrik Söderqvist / Tobias Sylwan	Result
9 August	(Latvia) Kegums	(Belgium) Jan Hendrickx / Tim Smeuninx	(Belgium) Jan Hendrickx / Tim Smeuninx	Result
9 August	(Latvia) Kegums	(Belgium) Jan Hendrickx / Tim Smeuninx	(Belgium) Jan Hendrickx / Tim Smeuninx	Result
16 August	(Russia) Penza	(Netherlands) Daniël Willemsen / (Belgium) Sven Verbrugge	(Netherlands) Daniël Willemsen / (Belgium) Sven Verbrugge	Result
16 August	(Russia) Penza	(Netherlands) Daniël Willemsen / (Belgium) Sven Verbrugge	(Netherlands) Daniël Willemsen / (Belgium) Sven Verbrugge	Result
23 August	(Estonia) Kiviõli	(Belgium) Jan Hendrickx / Tim Smeuninx	(Latvia) Jānis Daiders / Lauris Daiders	Result
23 August	(Estonia) Kiviõli	(Latvia) Janis Daiders / Lauris Daiders	(Latvia) Jānis Daiders / Lauris Daiders	Result
6 September	(France) Saint-Jean	(Belgium) Jan Hendrickx / Tim Smeuninx	(Latvia) Jānis Daiders / Lauris Daiders	Result
6 September	(France) Saint-Jean	(Netherlands) Daniël Willemsen / (Belgium) Sven Verbrugge	(Latvia) Jānis Daiders / Lauris Daiders	Result
13 September	(Germany) Rudersberg	(Belgium) Joris Hendrickx / (Latvia) Kaspars Liepiņš	(Belgium) Joris Hendrickx / (Latvia) Kaspars Liepiņš	Result
13 September	(Germany) Rudersberg	(United Kingdom) Stuart Brown / Luke Peters	(Belgium) Joris Hendrickx / (Latvia) Kaspars Liepiņš	Result
27 September	(Germany) Jauer	Belgium		

- The Sidecarcross des Nations in Jauer on 27 September 2009 is a non-championship event but part of the calendar and is denoted by a light blue background in the table above.

== Classification ==
=== Riders ===
The final standings of the 2009 season:

Position	Driver / Passenger	Equipment	Bike No	Points
1	(Belgium) Joris Hendrickx / (Latvia) Kaspars Liepins	KTM-VMC	4	483
2	(Belgium) Jan Hendrickx / Tim Smeuninx	KTM-VMC	3	465
3	(Latvia) Jānis Daiders / Lauris Daiders	KTM-VMC	8	418
4	(Germany) Marko Happich / (Switzerland) Martin Betschart	Zabel-MEFO	5	377
5	(Netherlands) Daniël Willemsen / (Belgium) Sven Verbrugge	Zabel-VMC	1	366
6	(Czech Republic) Václav Rozehnal / Marek Rozehnal	Zabel-VMC	7	365
7	(Latvia) Māris Rupeiks / Haralds Kurpnieks	KTM-WSP	6	341
8	(Netherlands) Etienne Bax / Marc van Deutekom	Zabel-VMC	10	300
9	(United Kingdom) Stuart Brown / Luke Peters	Husaberg-VMC	17	266
10	(Czech Republic) Tomáš Čermák / Ondřej Čermák	JAWA-MEFO	37	261
11	(Belgium) Peter Steegmans / (Netherlands) Christian Verhagen	Zabel-VMC	16	245
12	(Belgium) Nicky Pulinx / (Latvia) Kaspars Stupelis	Zabel-VMC	9	229
13	(Belgium) Kristof Santermans / Ben van den Bogaart	Zabel-WSP	19	182
14	(Germany) Thomas Morch / (Netherlands) Robbie Bax	Zabel-WSP	18	142
15	(Netherlands) Jan Visscher / Jeroen Visscher	Zabel-VMC	30	122
16	(Netherlands) Gerrit van Werven / Gertie Eggink	KTM-VMC	96	113
17	(United Kingdom) Daniel Millard / Joe Millard	Husaberg-WSP	35	109
18	(Belgium) Ben Adriaenssen / (Netherlands) Kenny van Gaalen	KTM-VMC	90	108
19	(Sweden) Henrik Söderqvist / Tobias Sylwan	Husaberg-MEFO	20	101
20	(Germany) Martin Walter / Andre Saam	Zabel-WSP	15	100
21	(Sweden) Robert Gustavsson / Henrik Apelgren	KTM-MEFO	747	52
22	(Switzerland) Joshua Luscher / (Austria) Markus Gloor	Husaberg-VMC	31	51
23	(Estonia) Margo Sonn / (Latvia) Elvijs Mucenieks	KTM-AYR	23	48
24	(Netherlands) Marcel Willemsen / (Switzerland) Bruno Kaelin	Zabel-WSP	11	41
25	(Austria) Kevin Bitsche / Johannes Vonbun	Zabel-WSP	67	41
26	(France) Benjamin Daniel / Guennady Auvray	Husaberg-WSP	41	39
27	(Netherlands) Thijs Derks / Roy Derks	Husaberg-EML	13	26
28	(Estonia) Gert Gordejev / Keit Kivaste	KTM-AYR	34	24
29	(Czech Republic) Lukáš Černý / (France) Edouard Chereau	JAWA-MEFO	21	22
30	(Russia) Evgeny Scherbinin / Sergey Sosnovskikh	KTM-AYR	79	19
31	(Croatia) Miroslav Knotig / (Netherlands) Robbie Bax	MEFO	98	19
32	(Russia) Roman Koch / Aleksey Bessarabov	Zabel	351	19
33	(France) Baptiste Bigand / Julien Bigand	Zabel-VMC	25	18
34	(Latvia) Arnolds Sīlis / Gints Sīlis	MTH-VMC	171	18
35	(United Kingdom) John Lyne / Steve Kirwin	KTM-VMC	24	17
36	(United Kingdom) Mark Kinge / Kev Foyle	Husaberg-WSP	71	17
37	(Netherlands) Eric Schrijver / Patrick van de Nieuwenhuizen	MTR-VMC	14	16
38	(Netherlands) Carlo van Duijnhoven / Tom van Duijnhoven	Zabel-VMC	12	14
39	(Finland) Joonas Saloniemi / Juho Saloniemi	KTM-AYR	53	14
40	(Russia) Michail Kursov / Pavel Anikin	Zabel	311	12
41	(Russia) Igor Rodionov / Dmitri Rodionov	KTM-AYR	199	12
42	(Germany) Andreas Rutter / Steffen Nicke	Zabel	102	11
43	(Belgium) Boudewijn Gommeren / Jean Pierre Loos	KTM-Bastech	130	11
44	(Estonia) Argo Poldsaar / Indrek Aljes	KTM-AYR	44	11
45	(Estonia) Sergei Ivanov / Atho Jalas	KTM-AYR	188	10
46	(Lithuania) Liutauras Variakojis / Arvydas Davidonis	KTM-AYR	49	9
47	(Belgium) Andreas Clohse / Birgen Beernaert	Zabel-VMC	27	8
48	(Netherlands) Marcel Grondman / Rick Sellis	Zabel-VMC	55	7
49	(Netherlands) Frank Mulders / Roy Derks	MTR-WSP	111	7
50	(France) Jean Marie Ains / Matthieu Cailleau	JAWA-MEFO	65	7
51	(Ukraine) Valeriy Starchenko / Evhen Potanin	Zabel-VMC	901	5
52	(United Kingdom) Richard Jenkins / Daniel Chamberlain	Zabel-VMC	87	5
53	(Ukraine) Dmytro Hrechanuk / Oleksandr Litovchenko	MTH-BSU	92	4
54	(France) Dorian Boileau / Paul Fressard	Husaberg-VMC	77	4
55	(Denmark) John Nielsen / Dennis Hansen	JAWA-VMC	191	3
56	(United Kingdom) Nick Jarvis / Josh Chamberlain	KTM-VMC	144	2
57	(Denmark) Tommy Sorensen / Andreas Linden	Husaberg-AYR	92	2
58	(Germany) Willi Liebl / (Czech Republic) Vladislav Gabor	Husaberg-MEFO	66	2
59	(Lithuania) Zigmas Žiukas / Jonas Davidonis	KTM-AYR	52	2
60	(France) Guillaume Martin / Edouard Chererau	Zabel-VMC	110	1
61	(Netherlands) Wim Janssen / Bart Notten	Zabel-VMC	36	1
62	(Germany) Werner Wittmann / (Czech Republic) Premysl Novotny	KTM-NMP	116	1
63	(Estonia) Kert Varik / Veikko Parksepp	KTM-AYR	45	1

- Equipment listed is motor and frame.

=== Manufacturers ===
Parallel to the riders championship, a manufacturers competition is also held. In every race, only the best-placed rider of every make is awarded points in this competition.

The final standings in the manufacturers competition were:

Position	Manufacturer	Points
1	VMC	642
2	MEFO	434
3	WSP	411
4	AYR	65
5	KTM	30
6	Husaberg	4
6	BSU	4
