= Terssac =

- Commune
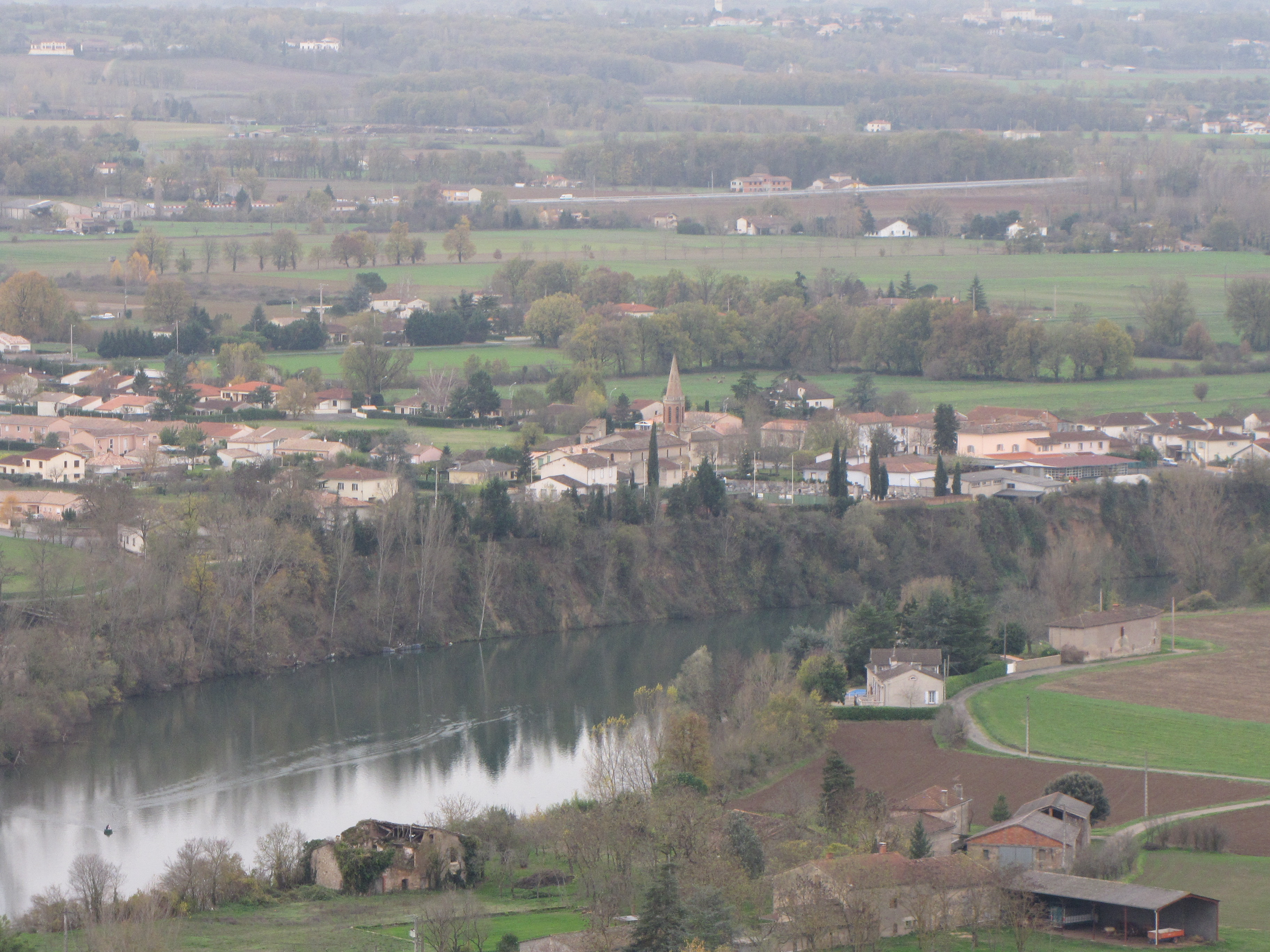
- A general view of Terssac

- Coat of arms
- Location of Terssac
- Location within France Location within Occitanie
- Coordinates: 43°55′41″N 2°04′26″E
- Country: France
- Region: Occitania
- Department: Tarn
- Arrondissement: Albi
- Canton: Albi-3
- Intercommunality: CA Albigeois

Government
  - Mayor (2020–2026): Yves Chapron
- Area^{1}: 5.43 km^{2} (2.10 sq mi)
- Elevation: 150 m (490 ft)
- Highest elevation: 162 m (531 ft)
- Lowest elevation: 133 m (436 ft)
- Population (2023): 1,195
  - Density: 220/km^{2} (570/sq mi)
- Time zone: UTC+01:00 (CET)
  - Summer (DST): UTC+02:00 (CEST)
- INSEE/Postal code: 81297 /81150
- ^{1} French Land Register data, which excludes lakes, ponds, glaciers > 1 km^{2} (0.386 sq mi or 247 acres) and river estuaries.

Terssac (French pronunciation: [tɛʁsak]; Occitan: Terçac) is a commune in the Tarn department in southern France.

== See also ==
- Communes of the Tarn department
