= Château de Castelnau-de-Lévis =

Castle in Occitania, France

Coordinates: 43°56′23″N 2°05′01″E

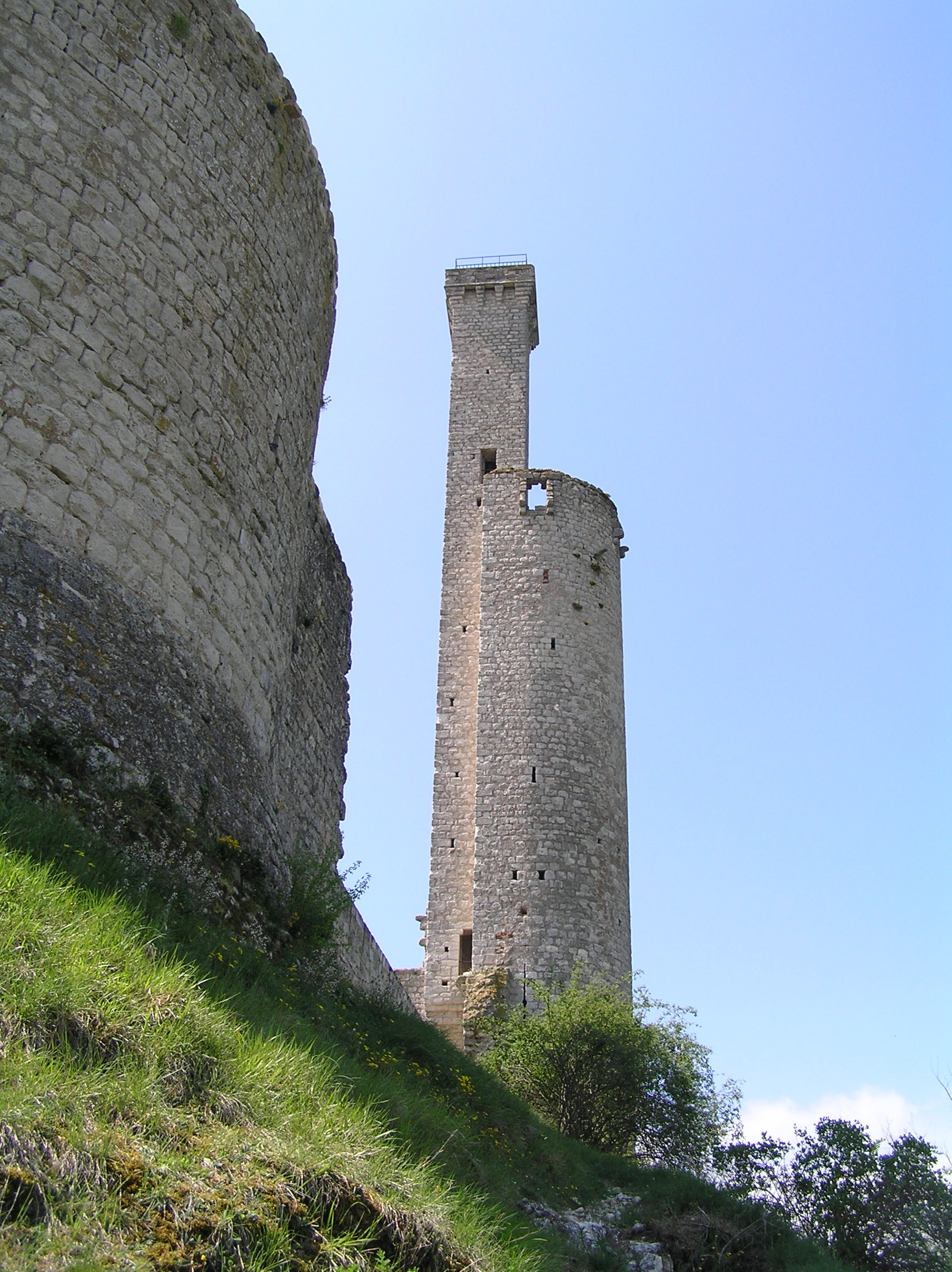
Chateau de Castelnau-de-Lévis

The Château de Castelnau-de-Lévis is a castle in the commune of Castelnau-de-Lévis in the Tarn département of France.

The castel was built at the beginning of the thirteenth century by Gicard Alamon, and called Castelnau de Bonnafonds. It was rebuilt by the Lévis family in the fifteenth century, when the seigneurie came into the possession of Hugues d'Amboise, baron d'Aubijoux; the fief remained with his descendants until the seventeenth century. Hugues' grandson, Louis d'Amboise, comte d'Aubijoux and baron de Castelnau-de Bonnafous, restored the castle and dwelt in it. The narrow square watchtower (tour de guet) is 40m tall.

Apart from the watchtower, all that remains today are remnants of other buildings. From the castle, there is a good view of Albi and the Tarn valley.

The castle is privately owned. It has been listed since 1909 as a monument historique by the French Ministry of Culture.

== See also ==
- List of castles in France
