= Castelnau-de-Lévis =

- Commune
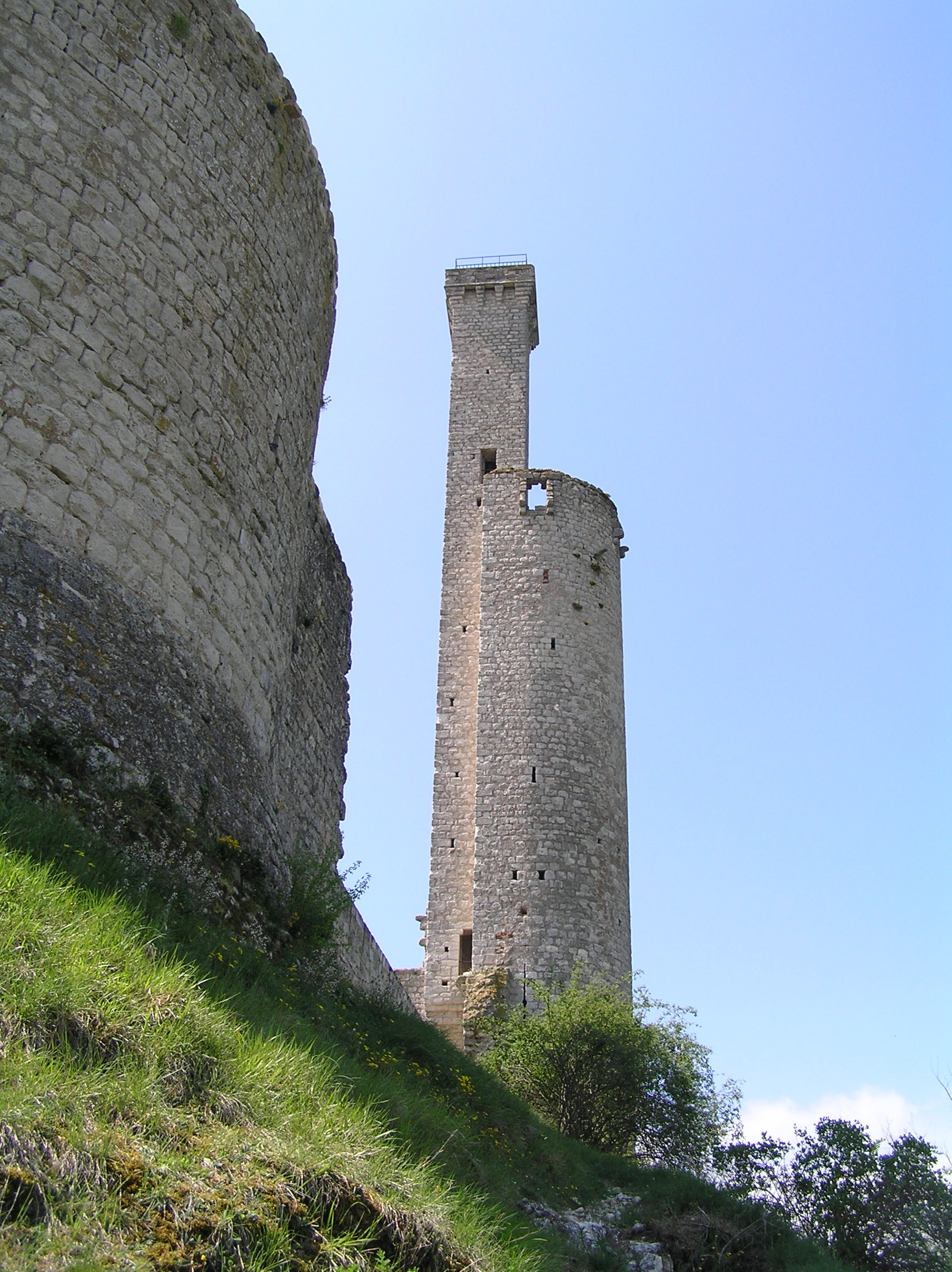
- Chateau

- Coat of arms
- Location of Castelnau-de-Lévis
- Location within France Location within Occitanie
- Coordinates: 43°56′15″N 2°05′01″E
- Country: France
- Region: Occitania
- Department: Tarn
- Arrondissement: Albi
- Canton: Albi-3
- Intercommunality: CA Albigeois

Government
  - Mayor (2020–2026): Patrice Delheure
- Area^{1}: 21.42 km^{2} (8.27 sq mi)
- Elevation: 143 m (469 ft)
- Highest elevation: 280 m (920 ft)
- Lowest elevation: 133 m (436 ft)
- Population (2023): 1,603
  - Density: 74.84/km^{2} (193.8/sq mi)
- Time zone: UTC+01:00 (CET)
  - Summer (DST): UTC+02:00 (CEST)
- INSEE/Postal code: 81063 /81150
- ^{1} French Land Register data, which excludes lakes, ponds, glaciers > 1 km^{2} (0.386 sq mi or 247 acres) and river estuaries.

Castelnau-de-Lévis (French pronunciation: [kastɛlno də levis]; Occitan: Castèlnòu de Lèvis) is a commune in the Tarn department in southern France.

It is located just west of Albi. The inhabitants are Castellévisiens.

== Monuments and sites ==
- Chateau de Castelnau-de-Lévis is a ruined castle dating from the 13th and 15th centuries.

== Motocross ==
The village at the base of the château is the site of a motocross championship, the Championnats du Monde MX3 et d’Europe 125 de Motocross. The track is also scheduled to host the French 2009 Sidecarcross world championship Grand Prix on 29 March 2009, however, this will still have to be confirmed by the FIM.

== See also ==
- Communes of the Tarn department
- Tourism in Tarn
