= Mailhoc =

- Commune
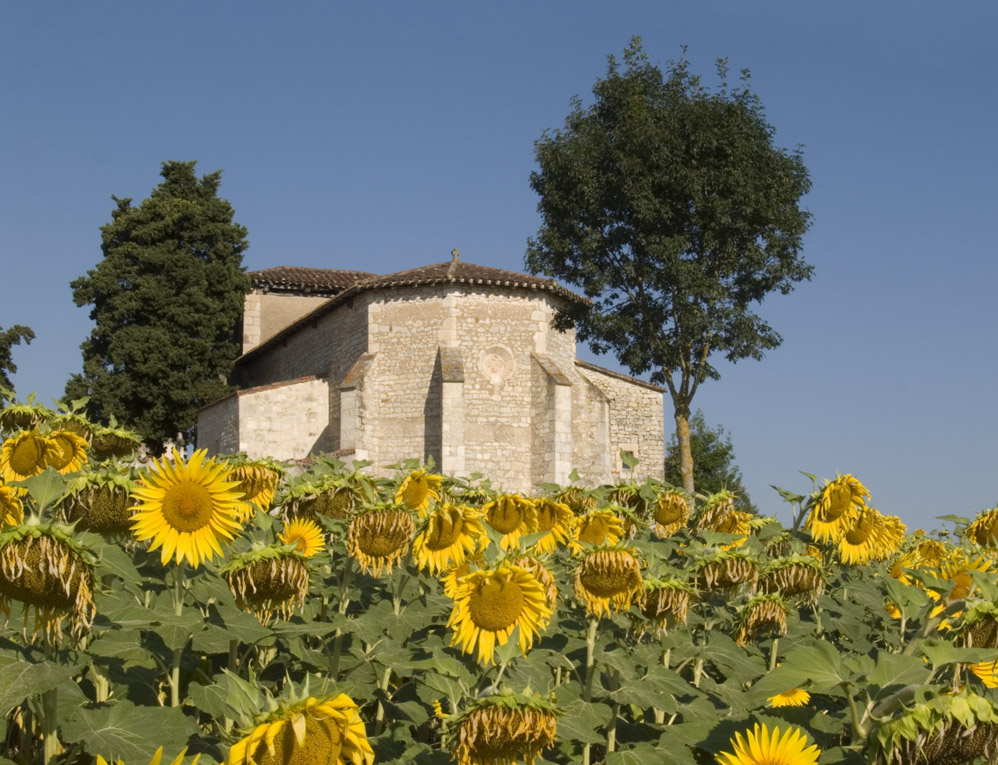
- The church in Mailhoc
- Location of Mailhoc
- Location within France Location within Occitanie
- Coordinates: 44°00′21″N 2°04′16″E
- Country: France
- Region: Occitania
- Department: Tarn
- Arrondissement: Albi
- Canton: Albi-3
- Intercommunality: Carmausin-Ségala

Government
  - Mayor (2020–2026): Jean-Marc Escoutes
- Area^{1}: 12.67 km^{2} (4.89 sq mi)
- Elevation: 293 m (961 ft)
- Highest elevation: 343 m (1,125 ft)
- Lowest elevation: 249 m (817 ft)
- Population (2023): 304
  - Density: 24.0/km^{2} (62.1/sq mi)
- Time zone: UTC+01:00 (CET)
  - Summer (DST): UTC+02:00 (CEST)
- INSEE/Postal code: 81152 /81130
- ^{1} French Land Register data, which excludes lakes, ponds, glaciers > 1 km^{2} (0.386 sq mi or 247 acres) and river estuaries.

Mailhoc (French pronunciation: [majɔk]; Occitan: Mailuòc) is a commune in the Tarn department in southern France.

== Geography ==
The Vère forms part of the commune's eastern border, then flows westward through the middle of the commune.

== See also ==
- Communes of the Tarn department
