= Lescure-d'Albigeois =

- Commune
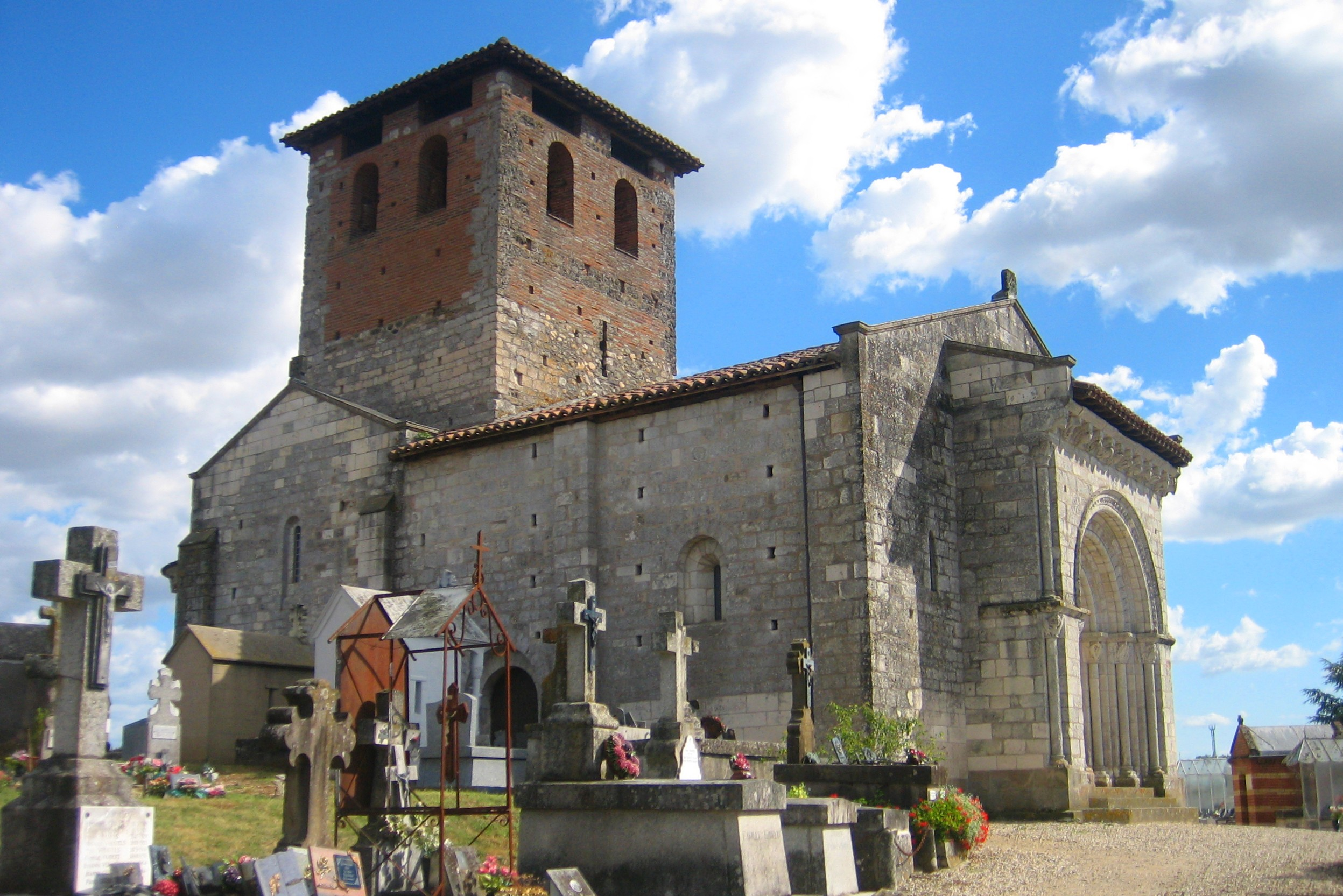
- The church in Lescure-d'Albigeois

- Coat of arms
- Location of Lescure-d'Albigeois
- Location within France Location within Occitanie
- Coordinates: 43°57′15″N 2°10′16″E
- Country: France
- Region: Occitania
- Department: Tarn
- Arrondissement: Albi
- Canton: Albi-4
- Intercommunality: CA Albigeois

Government
  - Mayor (2020–2026): Elisabeth Claverie
- Area^{1}: 14.18 km^{2} (5.47 sq mi)
- Elevation: 168 m (551 ft)
- Highest elevation: 302 m (991 ft)
- Lowest elevation: 154 m (505 ft)
- Population (2023): 4,590
  - Density: 324/km^{2} (838/sq mi)
- Time zone: UTC+01:00 (CET)
  - Summer (DST): UTC+02:00 (CEST)
- INSEE/Postal code: 81144 /81380
- ^{1} French Land Register data, which excludes lakes, ponds, glaciers > 1 km^{2} (0.386 sq mi or 247 acres) and river estuaries.

Lescure-d'Albigeois (French pronunciation: [lɛskyʁ dalbiʒwa]; Occitan: L'Escura) is a commune in the Tarn department in southern France.

== Population ==
Historical population
Year	Pop.	±% p.a.
1968	2,440	—
1975	2,810	+2.04%
1982	2,840	+0.15%
1990	3,229	+1.62%
1999	3,660	+1.40%
2007	3,980	+1.05%
2012	4,424	+2.14%
2017	4,577	+0.68%
2023	4,590	+0.05%
Source: INSEE

== See also ==
- Communes of the Tarn department
