= Lautrec =

- Commune
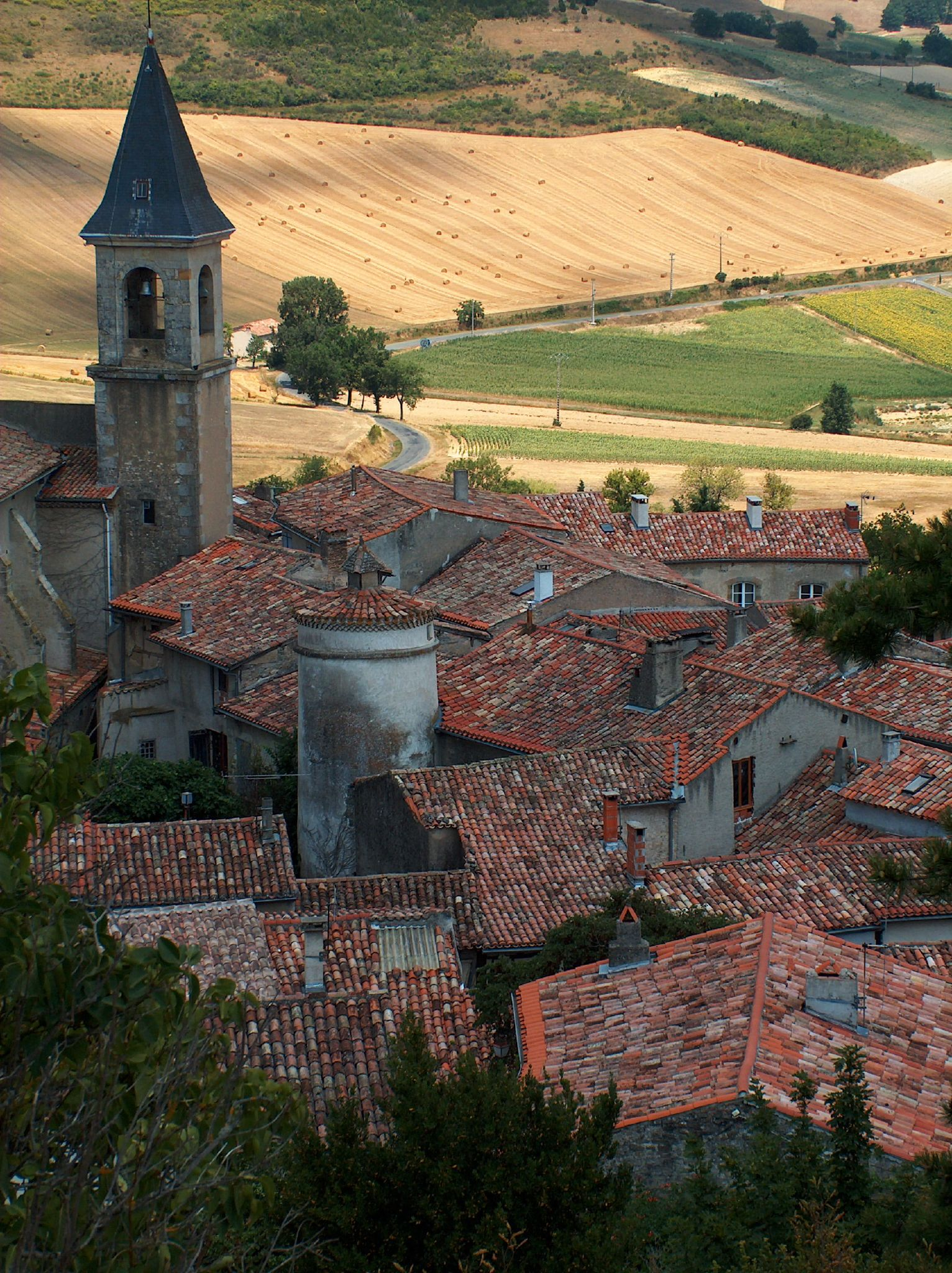
- A general view of Lautrec

- Coat of arms
- Location of Lautrec
- Location within France Location within Occitanie
- Coordinates: 43°42′25″N 2°08′23″E
- Country: France
- Region: Occitania
- Department: Tarn
- Arrondissement: Castres
- Canton: Plaine de l'Agoût
- Intercommunality: Lautrécois-Pays d'Agout

Government
  - Mayor (2020–2026): Thierry Bardou
- Area^{1}: 54.64 km^{2} (21.10 sq mi)
- Elevation: 292 m (958 ft)
- Highest elevation: 360 m (1,180 ft)
- Lowest elevation: 165 m (541 ft)
- Population (2023): 1,673
  - Density: 30.62/km^{2} (79.30/sq mi)
- Time zone: UTC+01:00 (CET)
  - Summer (DST): UTC+02:00 (CEST)
- INSEE/Postal code: 81139 /81440
- ^{1} French Land Register data, which excludes lakes, ponds, glaciers > 1 km^{2} (0.386 sq mi or 247 acres) and river estuaries.

Lautrec (French pronunciation: [lotʁɛk]; Occitan: Lautrèc) is a commune in the Tarn department in southern France.

== Demography ==
Historical population
Year	Pop.	±% p.a.
1968	1,508	—
1975	1,316	−1.93%
1982	1,503	+1.92%
1990	1,527	+0.20%
1999	1,554	+0.19%
2007	1,706	+1.17%
2012	1,798	+1.06%
2017	1,783	−0.17%
2023	1,673	−1.06%
Source: INSEE

== Remarkable sites ==
Lautrec is a member of Les Plus Beaux Villages de France (The Most Beautiful Villages of France) Association, as well as a "Remarkable Site for Taste" thanks to its renowned pink garlic. Its remarkable sites include:

- the village itself, with its 14th century market square
- the Saint Remy collegiate church and its sumptuous marble retable
- the 17th century windmill, one of the few still working today in the South of France
- a clog workshop, recreated after the one that existed there until the early 1960s
- the Caussade Gate (13th century)
- the Salette calvary (altitude 328 m)
- the Roman road

== See also ==
- Famous painter Henri de Toulouse-Lautrec’s family had roots in this village
- Communes of the Tarn department
- Tourism in Tarn
