= Sainte-Croix, Tarn =

Sainte-Croix
- Commune
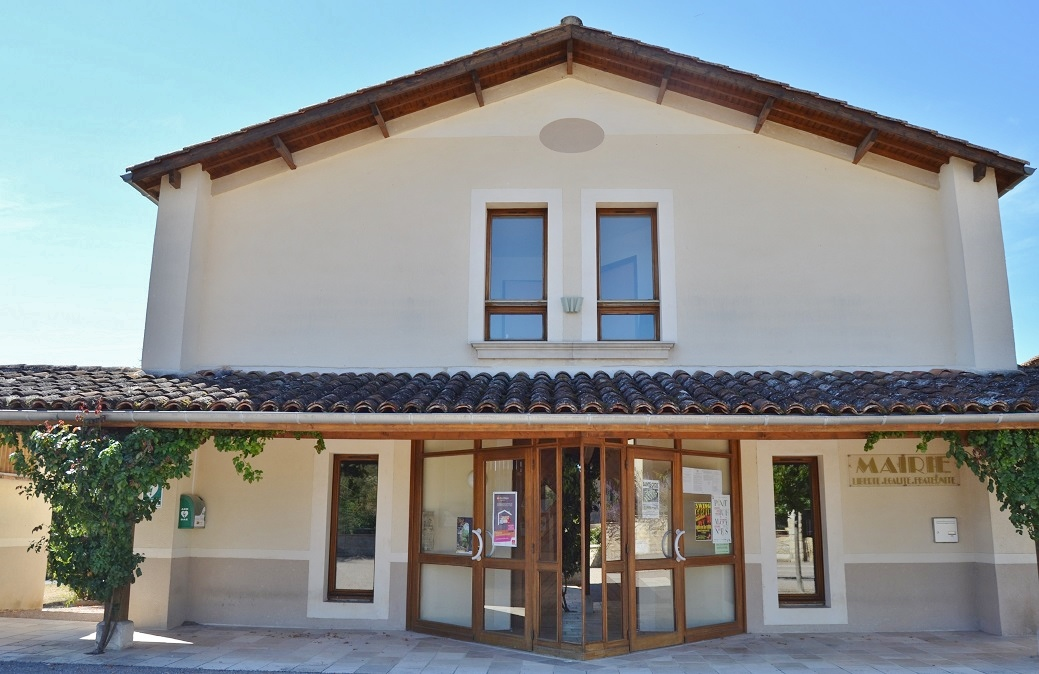
- Sainte-Croix Town hall
- Location of Sainte-Croix
- Location within France Location within Occitanie
- Coordinates: 43°58′22″N 2°04′07″E
- Country: France
- Region: Occitania
- Department: Tarn
- Arrondissement: Albi
- Canton: Albi-3

Government
  - Mayor (2020–2026): Jean-Marc Balaran
- Area^{1}: 7.22 km^{2} (2.79 sq mi)
- Elevation: 225 m (738 ft)
- Highest elevation: 307 m (1,007 ft)
- Lowest elevation: 195 m (640 ft)
- Population (2023): 417
  - Density: 57.8/km^{2} (150/sq mi)
- Time zone: UTC+01:00 (CET)
  - Summer (DST): UTC+02:00 (CEST)
- INSEE/Postal code: 81326 /81150
- ^{1} French Land Register data, which excludes lakes, ponds, glaciers > 1 km^{2} (0.386 sq mi or 247 acres) and river estuaries.

Sainte-Croix (French pronunciation: [sɛ̃t kʁwa]; Languedocien: Senta Crotz) is a commune in the Tarn department in southern France.

In 2019, the commune had 386 inhabitants.

== See also ==
- Communes of the Tarn department
