= Le Garric =

- Commune
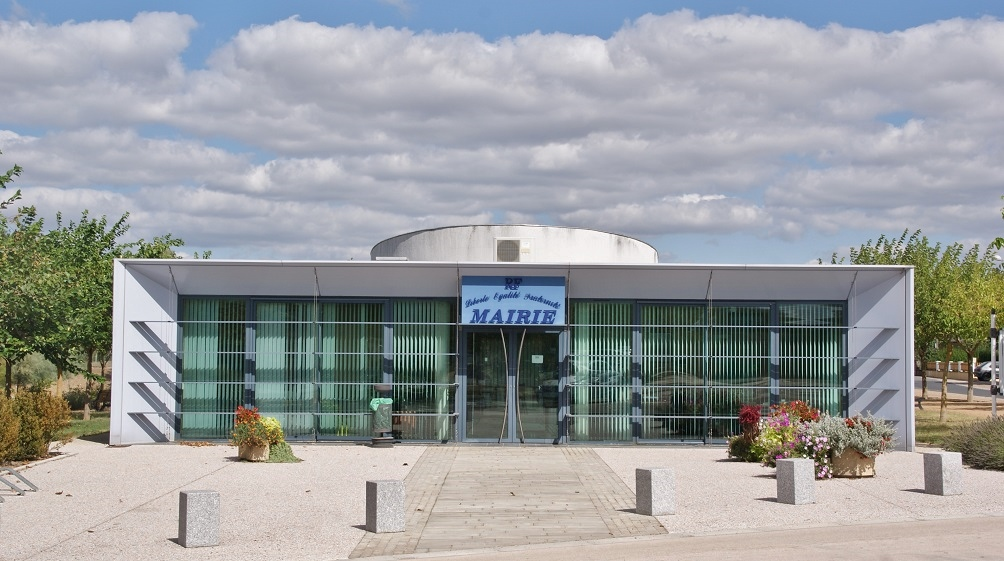
- Le Garric Town hall
- Location of Le Garric
- Location within France Location within Occitanie
- Coordinates: 44°00′38″N 2°09′50″E
- Country: France
- Region: Occitania
- Department: Tarn
- Arrondissement: Albi
- Canton: Albi-4

Government
  - Mayor (2020–2026): Christian Vedel
- Area^{1}: 22.88 km^{2} (8.83 sq mi)
- Elevation: 280 m (920 ft)
- Highest elevation: 359 m (1,178 ft)
- Lowest elevation: 178 m (584 ft)
- Population (2023): 1,302
  - Density: 56.91/km^{2} (147.4/sq mi)
- Time zone: UTC+01:00 (CET)
  - Summer (DST): UTC+02:00 (CEST)
- INSEE/Postal code: 81101 /81450
- ^{1} French Land Register data, which excludes lakes, ponds, glaciers > 1 km^{2} (0.386 sq mi or 247 acres) and river estuaries.

Le Garric (French pronunciation: [lə ɡaʁik]; Occitan: Lo Garric, meaning the oak tree) is a commune in the Tarn department in southern France.

== See also ==
- Communes of the Tarn department
