= La Clayette =

- Commune
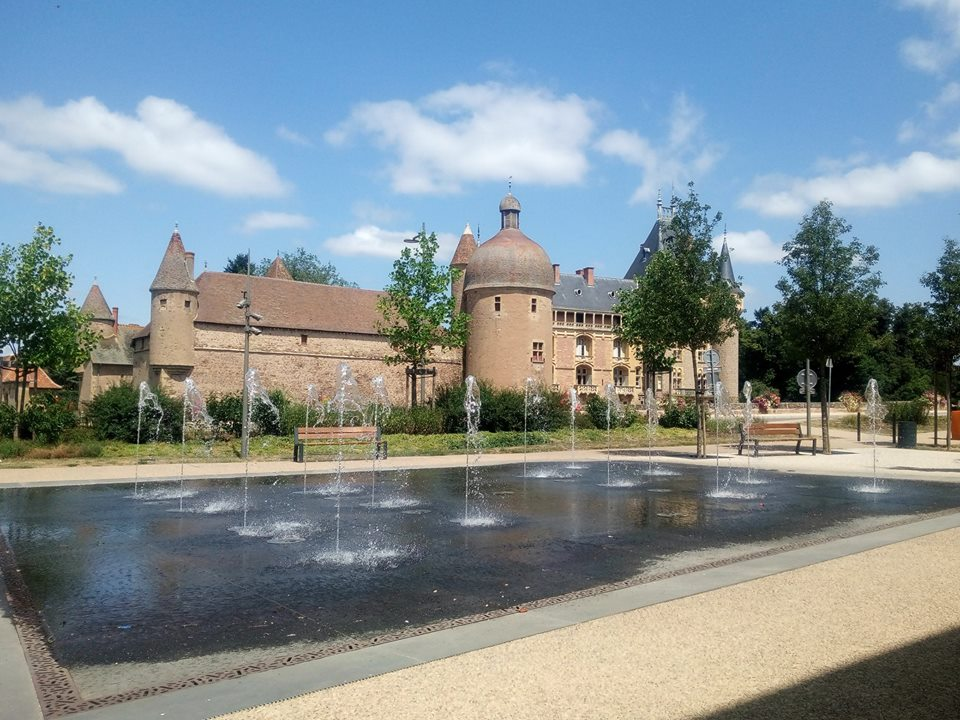
- The Château de La Clayette as seen from the Place des Fossés

- Coat of arms
- Location of La Clayette
- Location within France Location within Bourgogne-Franche-Comté
- Coordinates: 46°17′26″N 4°18′20″E
- Country: France
- Region: Bourgogne-Franche-Comté
- Department: Saône-et-Loire
- Arrondissement: Charolles
- Canton: Chauffailles
- Intercommunality: CC Brionnais Sud Bourgogne

Government
  - Mayor (2020–2026): Christian Lavenir
- Area^{1}: 3.12 km^{2} (1.20 sq mi)
- Elevation: 385 m (1,263 ft)
- Highest elevation: 437 m (1,434 ft)
- Lowest elevation: 336 m (1,102 ft)
- Population (2023): 1,563
  - Density: 501/km^{2} (1,300/sq mi)
- Time zone: UTC+01:00 (CET)
  - Summer (DST): UTC+02:00 (CEST)
- INSEE/Postal code: 71133 /71800
- ^{1} French Land Register data, which excludes lakes, ponds, glaciers > 1 km^{2} (0.386 sq mi or 247 acres) and river estuaries.

La Clayette (French pronunciation: [la.klɛt]) is a commune in the east-central French department of Saône-et-Loire.

== Geography ==
La Clayette is situated in the southernmost part of Burgundy in the Charolais-Brionnais region, north of the historical province of Beaujolais. As the cradle of the renowned Charolais cattle, the Charolais-Brionnais region is an applicant for the UNESCO's label as World Heritage Site to preserve, consolidate and transmit this resource.

=== Access ===
- By road: the town is situated at the crossroads of the routes D985 and D987, 40 km (25 mi) from Roanne, 60 km (37 mi) from Mâcon, 90 km (56 mi) from Lyon and 100 km (62 mi) from Moulins.
- By rail: La Clayette-Baudemont station is situated on the line from Lyon to Paray-le-Monial. Travel time to Lyon is about 80 minutes.
- By plane: Saint-Yan Airport, also known as Charolais Bourgogne Sud Airport, is located about 30 kilometers (19 miles) northwest of La Clayette. The nearest international airport is Lyon–Saint Exupéry Airport.

== History ==
- 1435: Creation of the borough of La Clayette by the Chantemerle family.
- 1437: Creation of the fairs.
- 1450: Creation of the markets.
- 1632: Alice de Chantemerle founded by will the convent of the Minimes, the building which is now the town hall.
- Until the French Revolution in 1789, La Clayette was governed from Varennes-sous-Dun.

== Economy ==
Founded by Faustin Potain in 1928, the Potain company turned La Clayette into the cradle of tower cranes. During the heyday of the company in the 1970s, more than 800 people worked in the town, exporting cranes all over the world. The American manufacturer Manitowoc Cranes bought the Potain company in 2001. The historic factory in La Clayette closed in 2010.

== Demography ==
Historical population
Year	Pop.	±% p.a.
1968	2,530	—
1975	2,845	+1.69%
1982	2,669	−0.91%
1990	2,307	−1.81%
1999	2,069	−1.20%
2007	1,919	−0.94%
2012	1,785	−1.44%
2017	1,656	−1.49%
2023	1,563	−0.96%
Source: INSEE

La Clayette is the centre of a small urban unit (population about 2,800) which includes the communes Baudemont and Varennes-sous-Dun.

== Places and monuments ==
=== Château de La Clayette ===
Dating back to the 14th century, the Château de La Clayette is partly surrounded by a small lake of 30 hectares (74 acres) and a water-filled moat. It was expanded to its current size in the 19th century and is now a listed historical monument.

=== Chapelle Sainte-Avoye ===
The construction of the Sainte-Avoye's chapel, in the flamboyant gothic style, was due to Louis de Chantemerle in the 15th century.

=== Église de l'Assomption de Notre-Dame ===
The Église de l'Assomption de Notre-Dame (English: The Assumption of Our Lady's Church) is a Catholic Church designed by the French architect Pinchard. Construction began in 1889 and was completed in 1894. Some of the stained glasses were painted by Lucien Bégule.

== Gallery ==
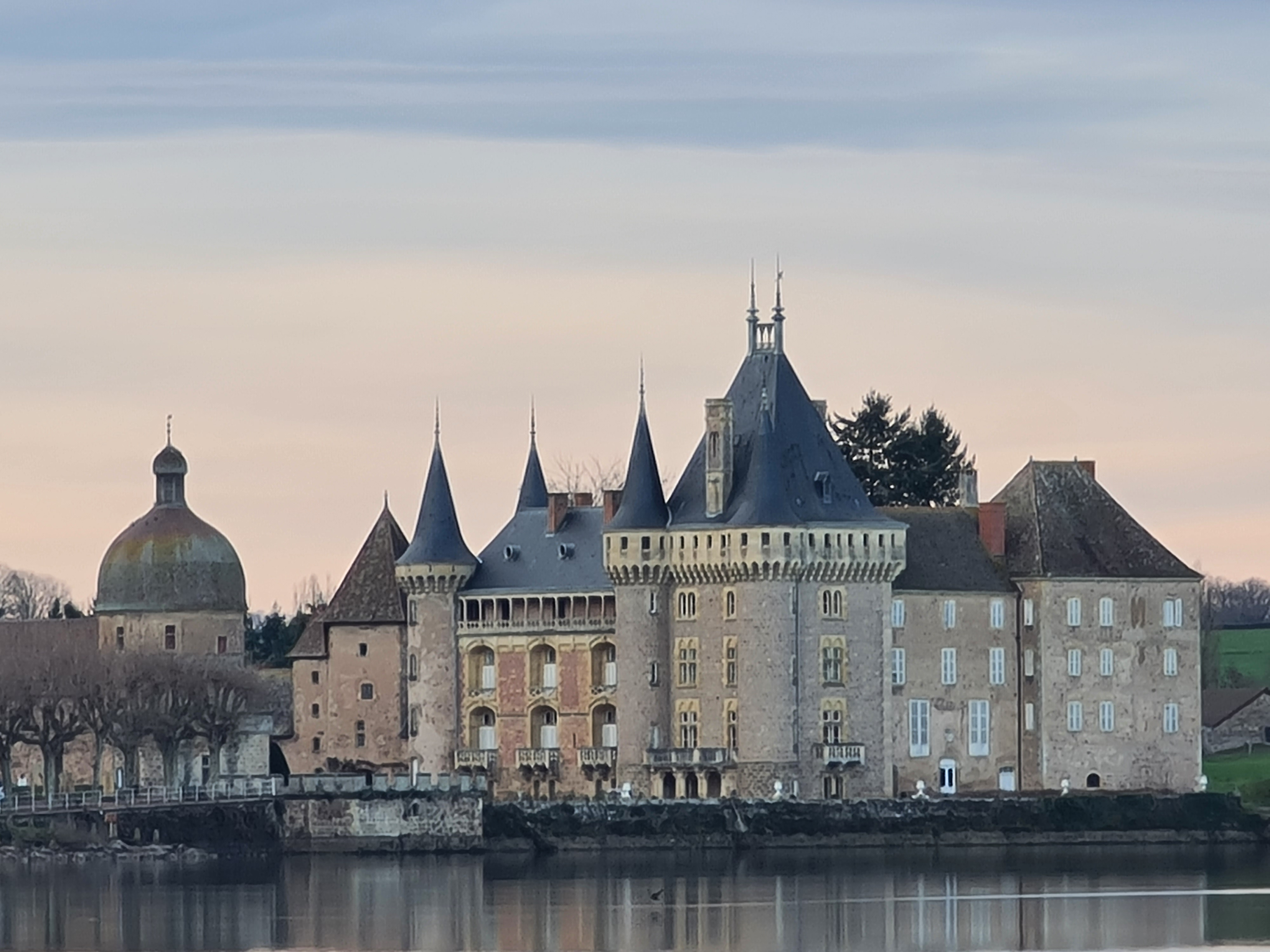
Château de La Clayette

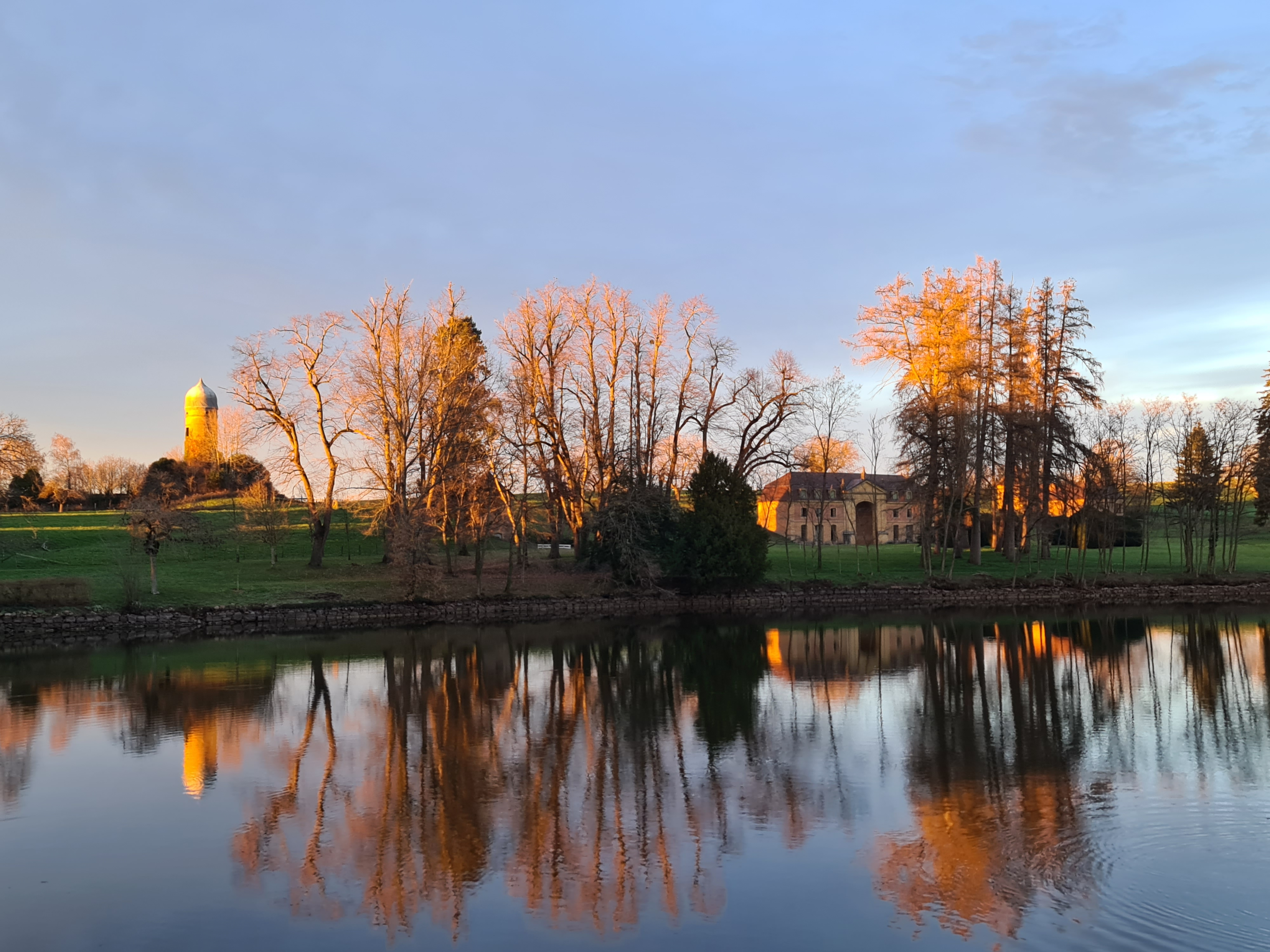
Lake and château park

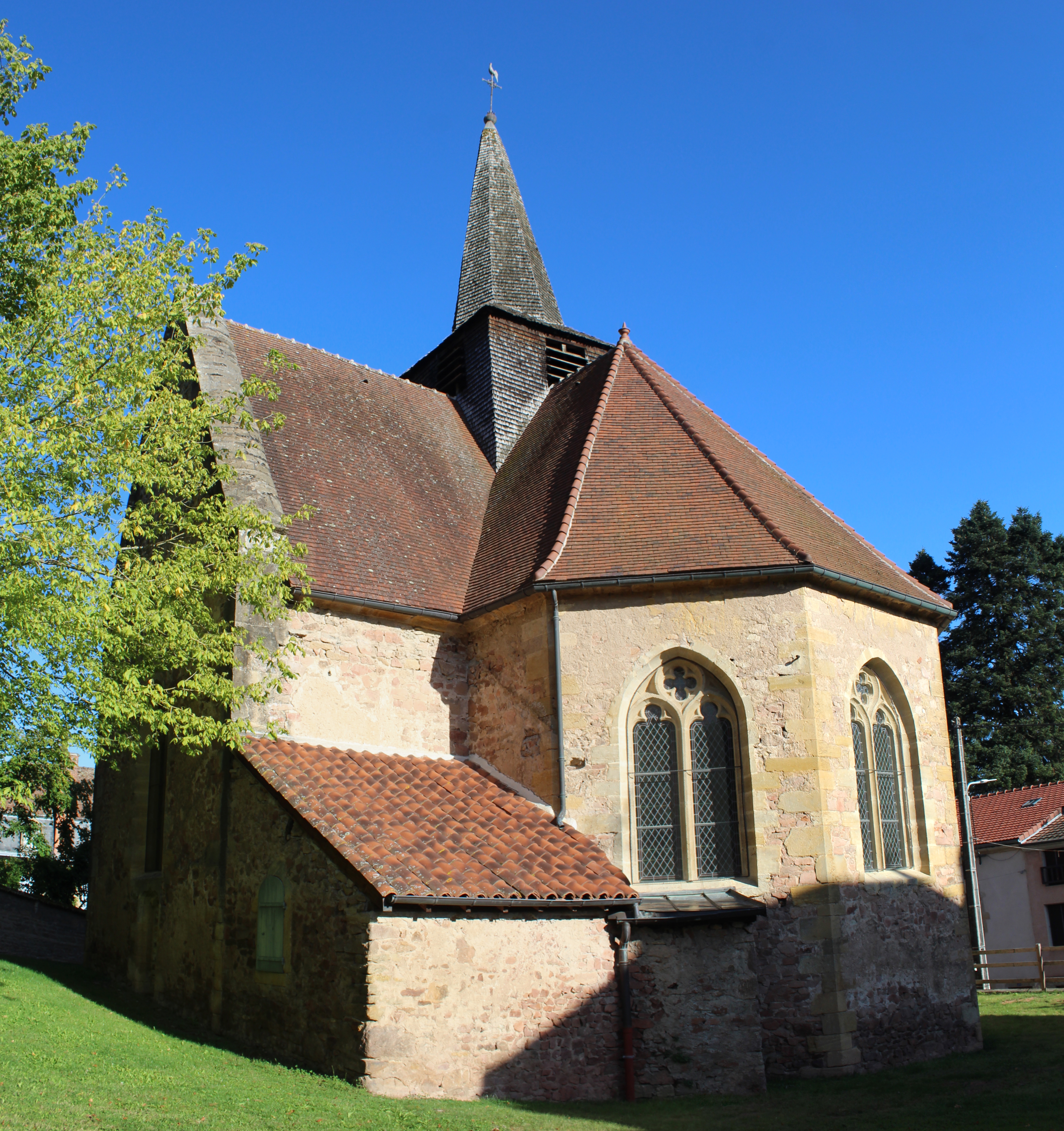
Sainte-Avoye's chapel

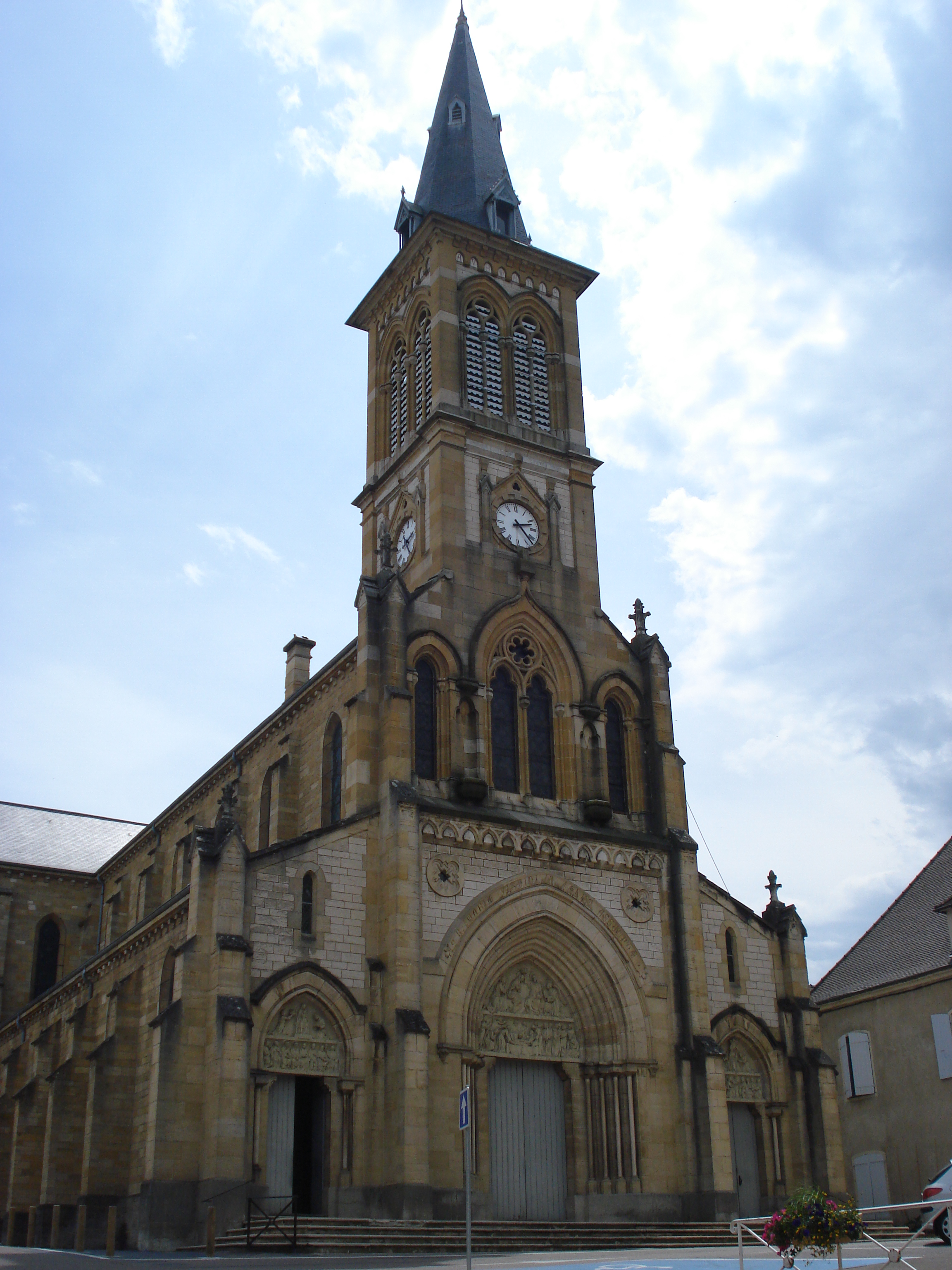
Assumption of Our Lady's Church

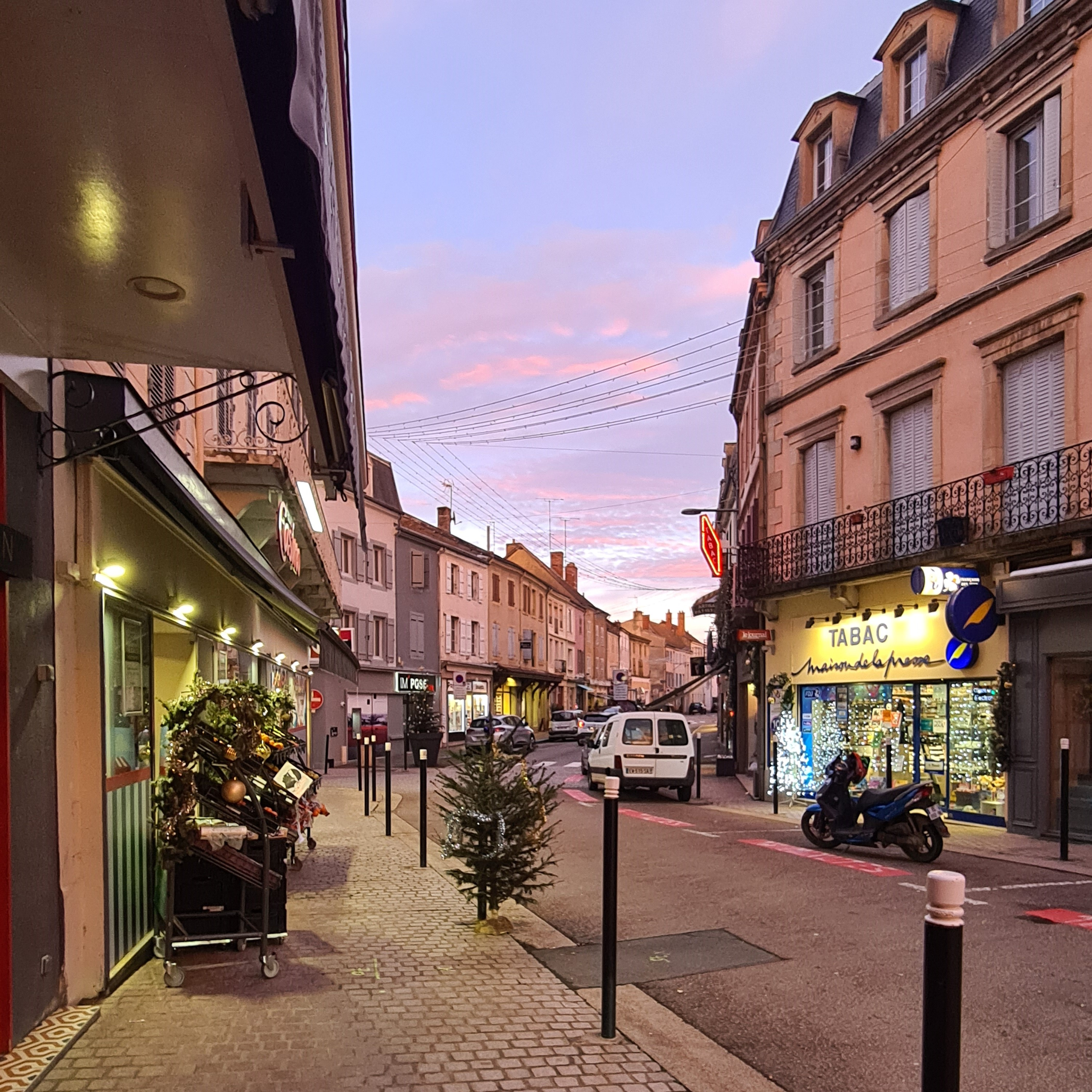
Main street

== Twin towns and sister cities ==
- Göllheim, Germany
- Marano Equo, Italy

== Notable people ==
- Jean-Claude Delamétherie (1743–1817), mineralogist, geologist, paleontologist, first mayor of La Clayette in 1790
- Joseph Jolinon (1885–1971), writer, recipient of the Grand Prix du Roman in 1950
- André Néron (1922–1985), mathematician, recipient of the Émile Picard Medal in 1983
- Faustin Potain (1898–1968), industrial, inventor of the tower crane

== See also ==
- Communes of the Saône-et-Loire department
