= Charolais-Brionnais region =

Charolais-Brionnais region Pays Charolais-Brionnais
- Natural region
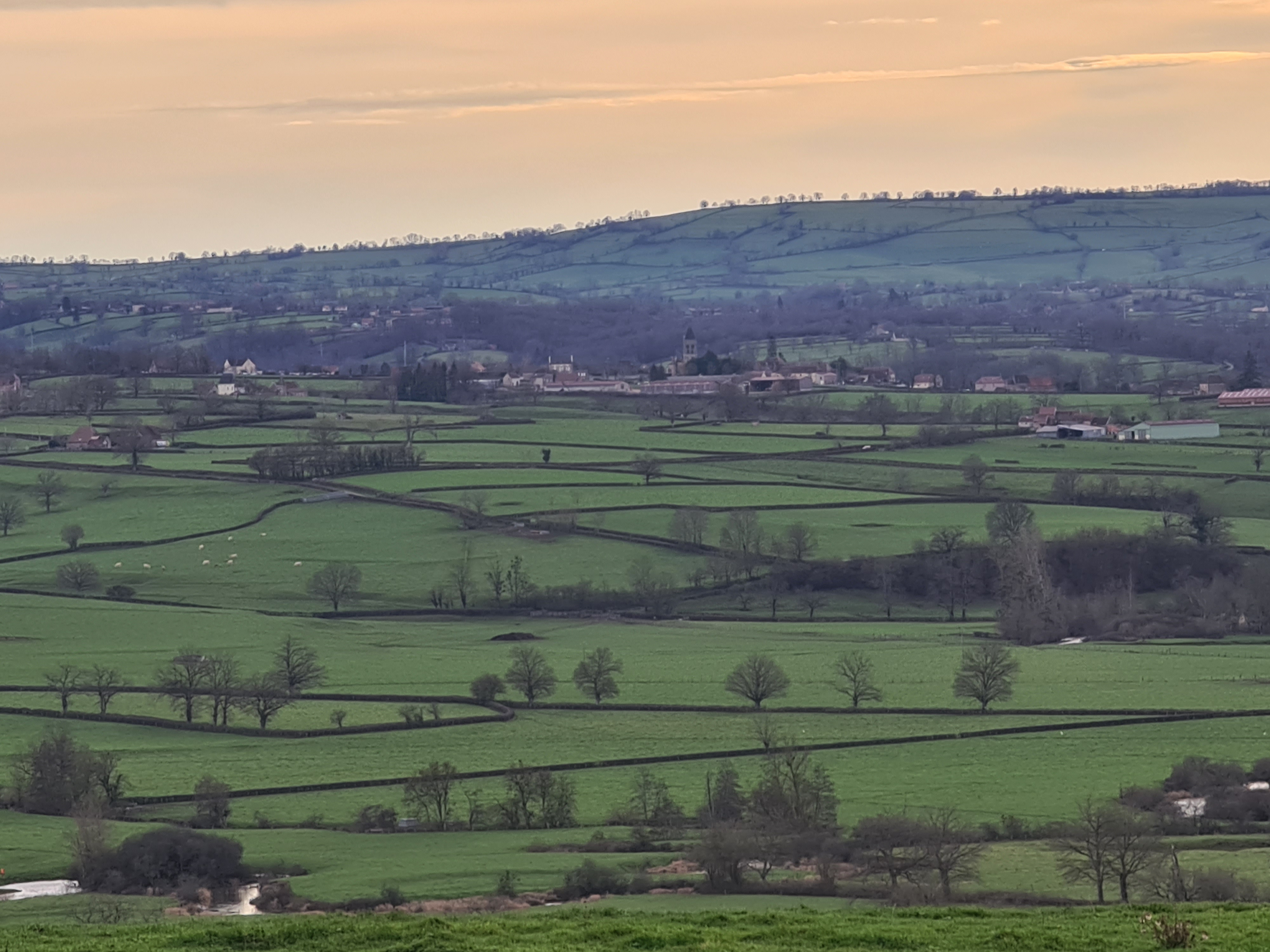
- Bocage landscape in the Arconce valley

- Location within France
- Coordinates: 46.3756°N 4.17181945806°E
- Country: France
- Region: Bourgogne-Franche-Comté
- Department: Saône-et-Loire
- Arrondissement: Charolles
- Capital: Paray-le-Monial

Area
  - Total: 2,500 km^{2} (970 sq mi)

Population
  - Total: 90,000
  - Density: 36/km^{2} (93/sq mi)
- Website: www.charolais-brionnais.fr

The Charolais-Brionnais region (French: Pays Charolais-Brionnais) is located in the southwest of the French department of Saône-et-Loire, in Burgundy. Created in 2004, the region comprises a population of 90,000 inhabitants across 129 municipalities.

== Geography ==
The Charolais-Brionnais region is home to the renowned Charolais cattle and is an applicant for UNESCO status as a World Heritage Site to preserve, consolidate and transmit this resource.

The Loire River, flanked by its adjoining canals, flows on the western edge of Charolais-Brionnais. The EuroVelo long-distance cycling route EV6, also named the Rivers Route, leaves the Loire at Digoin for the Canal du Centre, where it starts its way through the Charolais.

The Charolais-Brionnais was awarded with two food certifications of the European Union (protected designation of origin; French: Appellation d'origine protégée) for AOP Charolles Beef and AOP Charolais Goat Cheese.

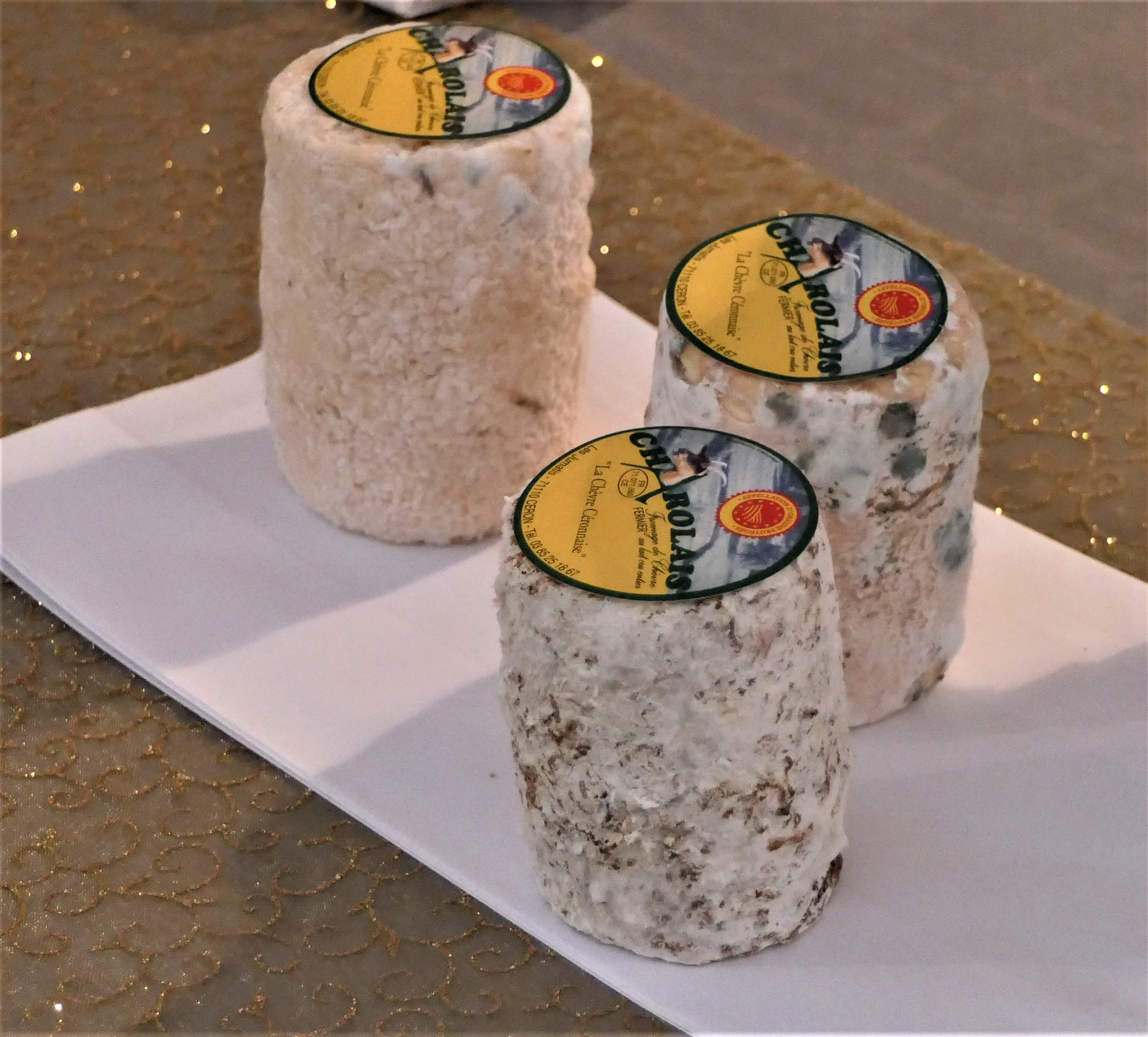
Charolais goat cheese

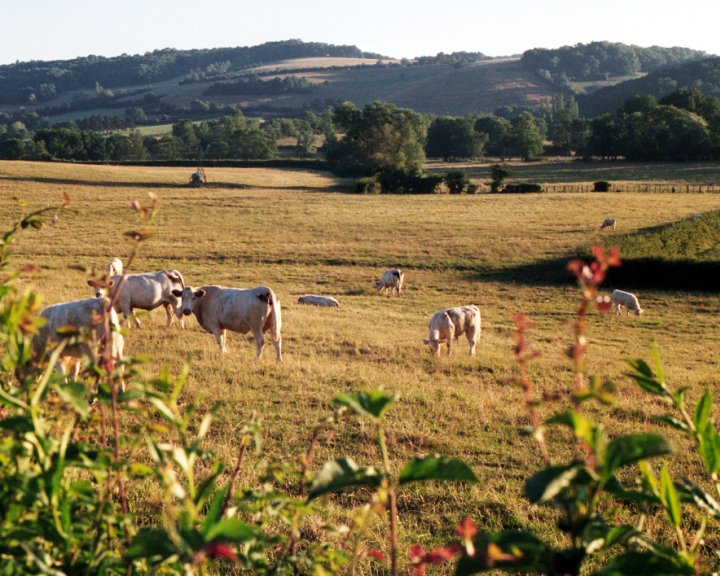
Charolais cattle

== Noteworthy landmarks and towns ==
- Paray-le-Monial, nicknamed the city of the Sacred Heart
- Charolles, nicknamed the Venice of the Charolais
- Bourbon-Lancy, a spa town with a 2,000-year history
- La Clayette and its 14th- and 19th-century castle
- Semur-en-Brionnais and its 9th-century castle, one of the oldest in Burgundy
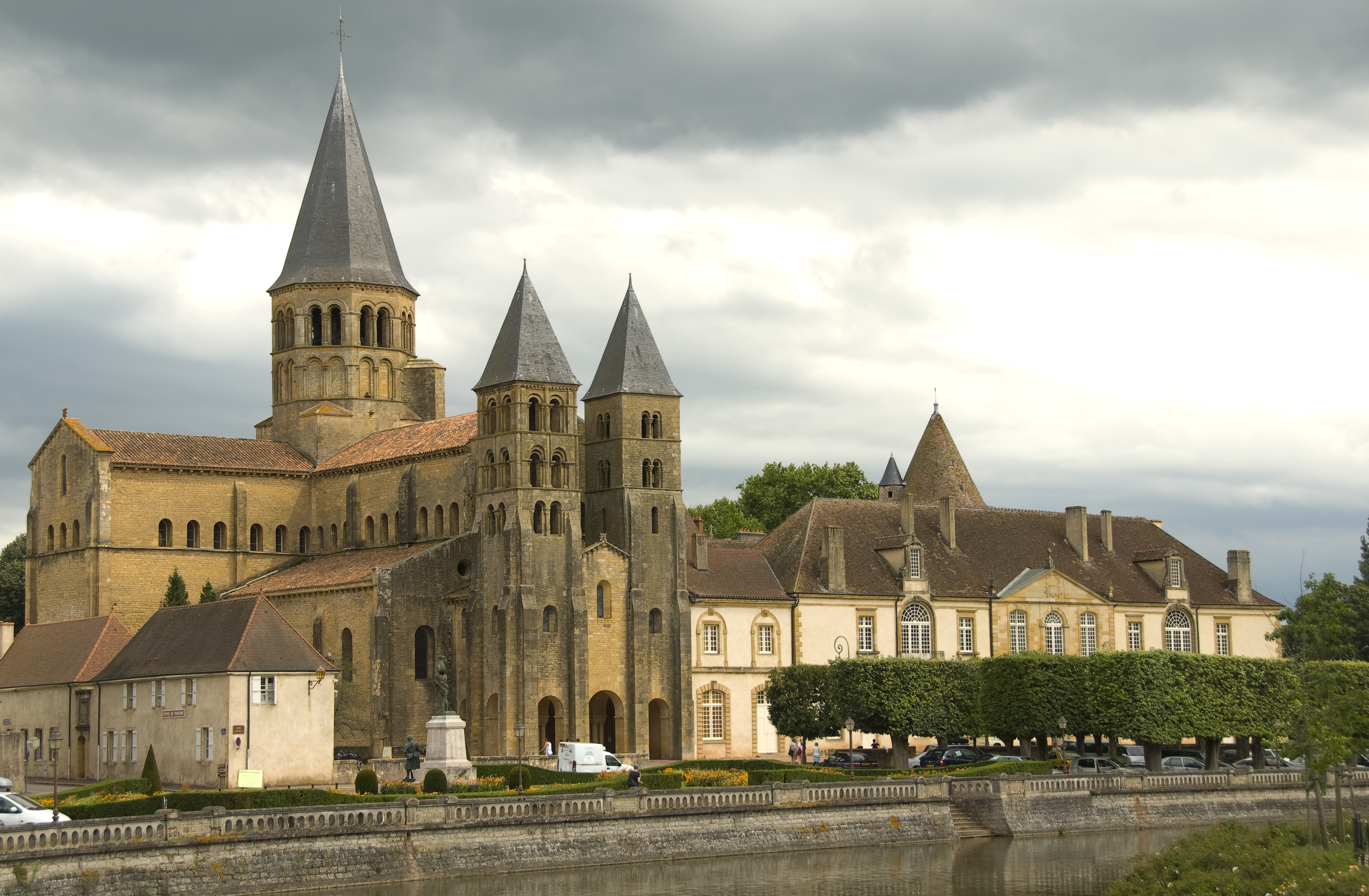
Basilica of the Sacred Heart in Paray-le-Monial

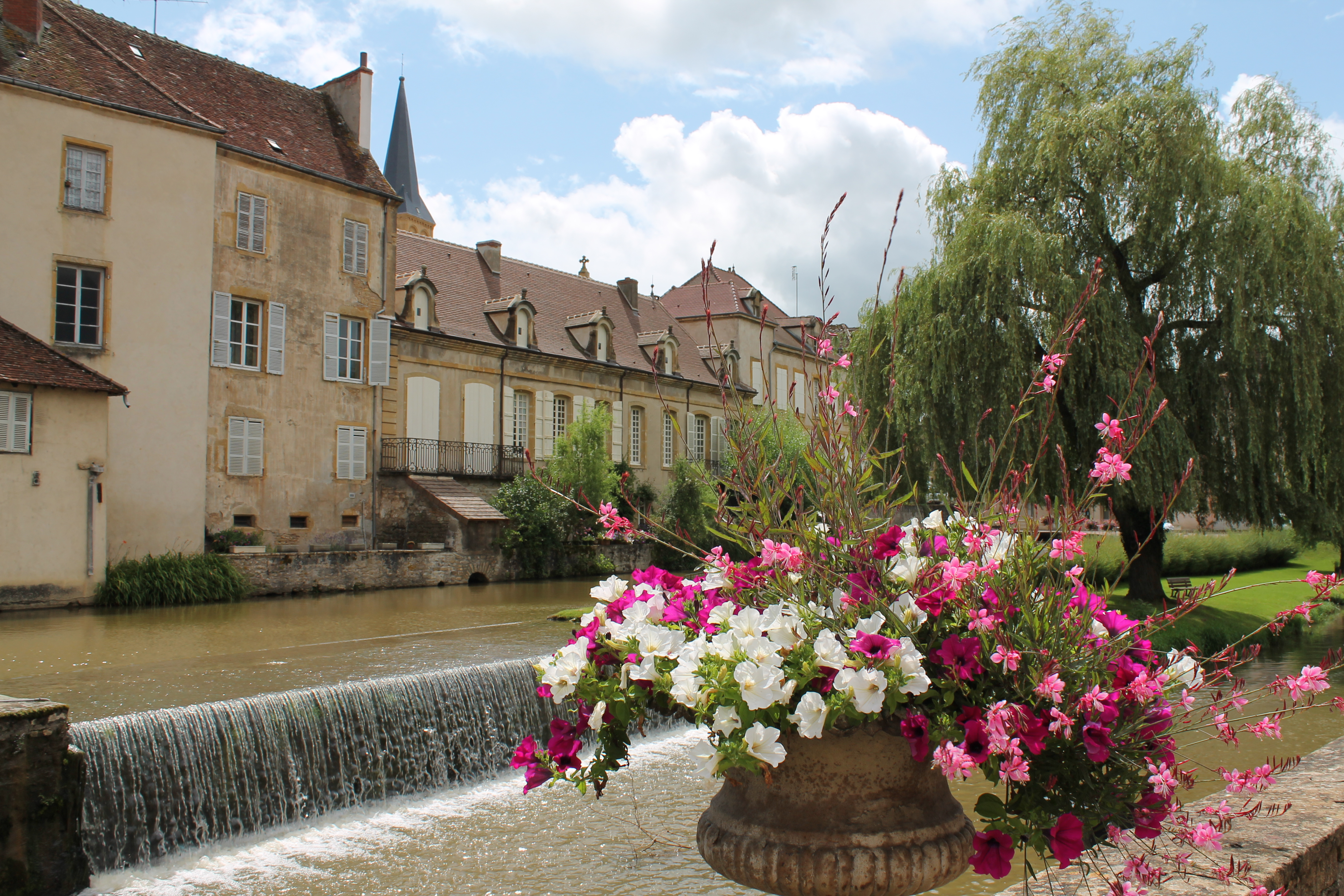
The town of Charolles in the Charolais

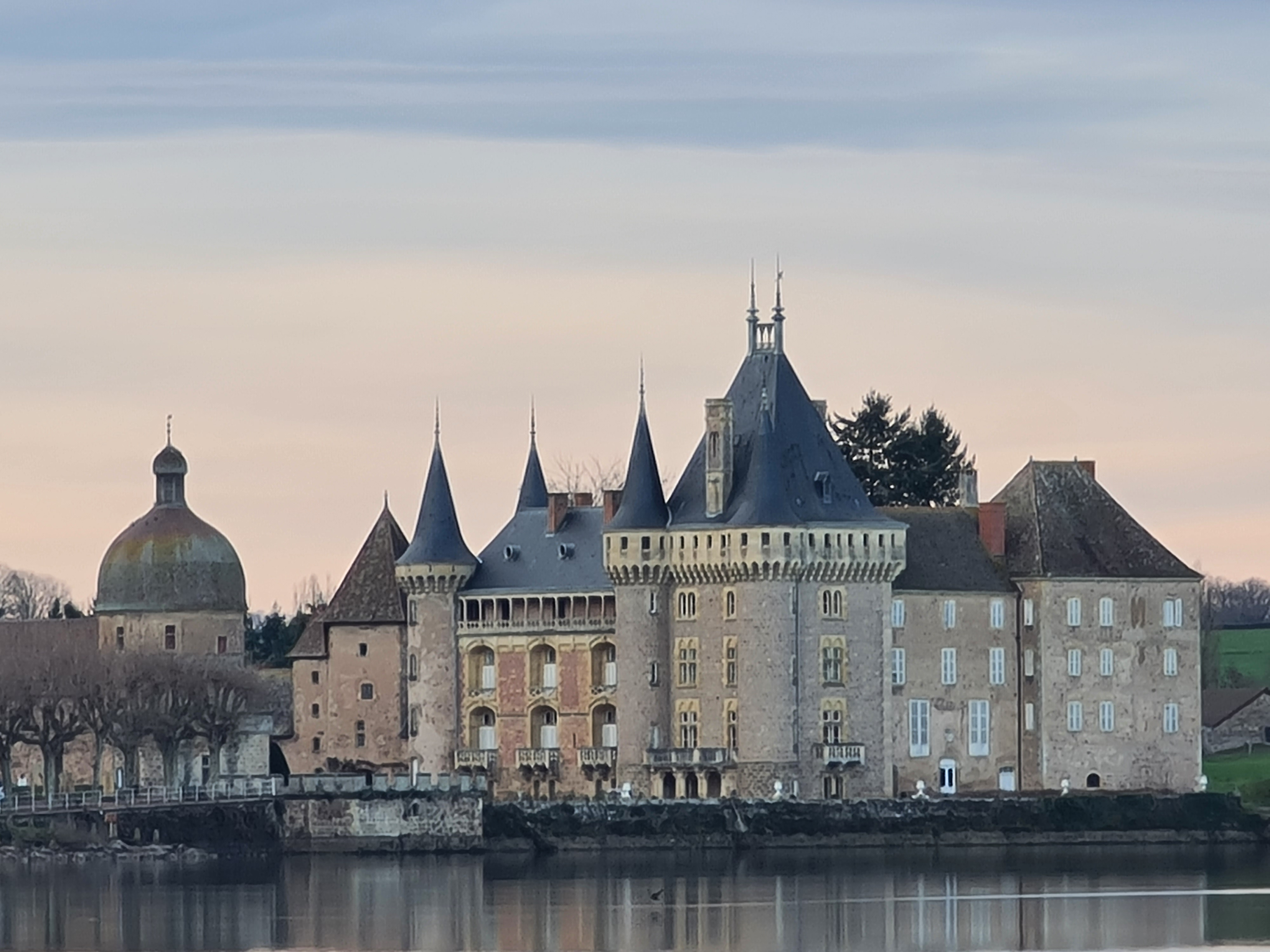
Château de La Clayette in the Brionnais

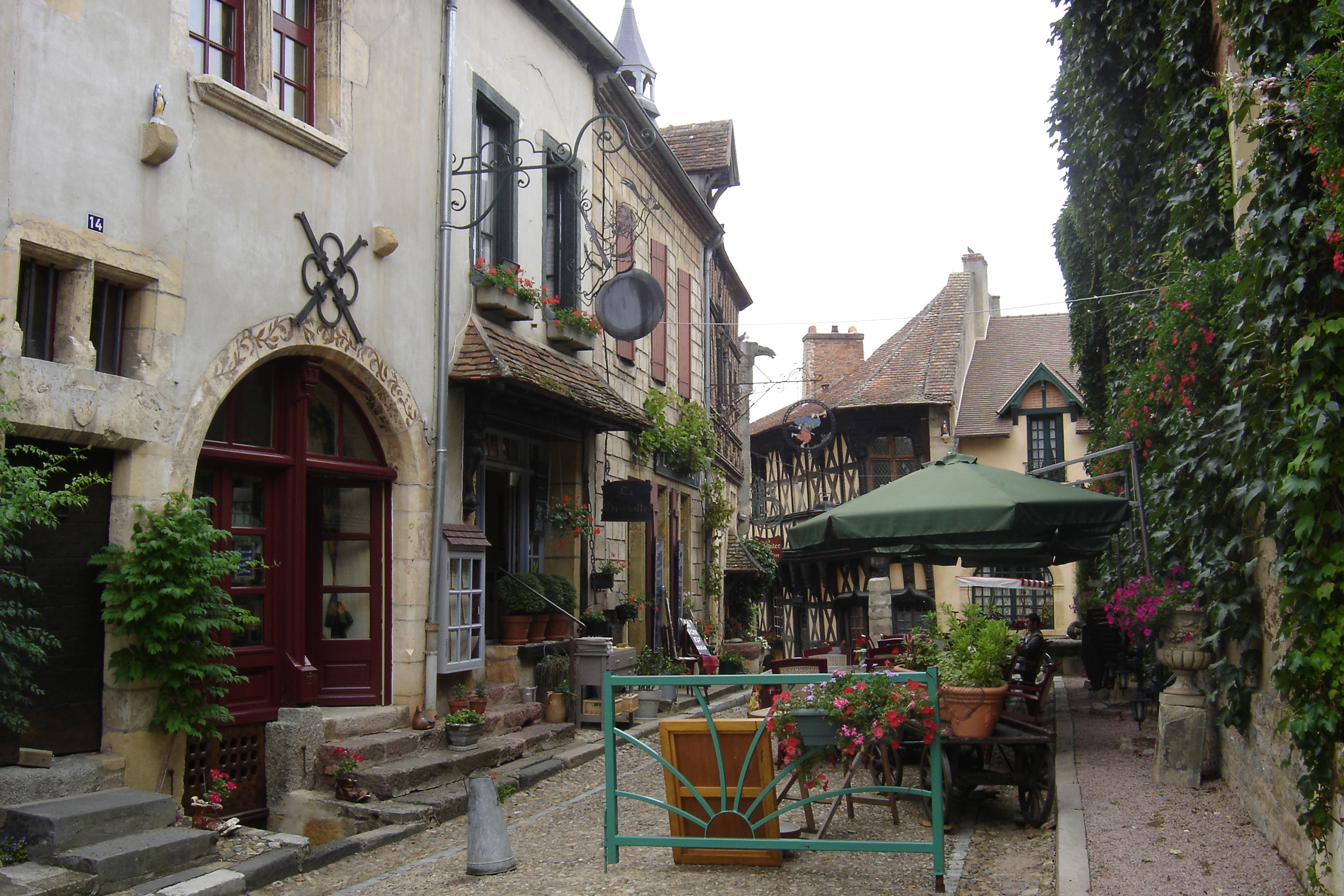
Medieval center of Bourbon-Lancy
