= Joseph Jolinon =

French writer

Joseph Jolinon (1885-1971) was a French writer. He was born in La Clayette and studied law in Lille. He was mobilized in 1914, and served as a soldier throughout the First World War. Afterwards, he took up the law profession and settled in Lyon. He became a professional writer in the 1920s. The author of more than two dozen books, he won the Grand prix du roman awarded by the Académie française in 1950 for his novel cycle Les Provinciaux.
