= Basilica of the Sacred Heart of Paray-le-Monial =

Basilica in Paray-le-Monial, France

Coordinates: 46°26′59″N 4°7′17″E

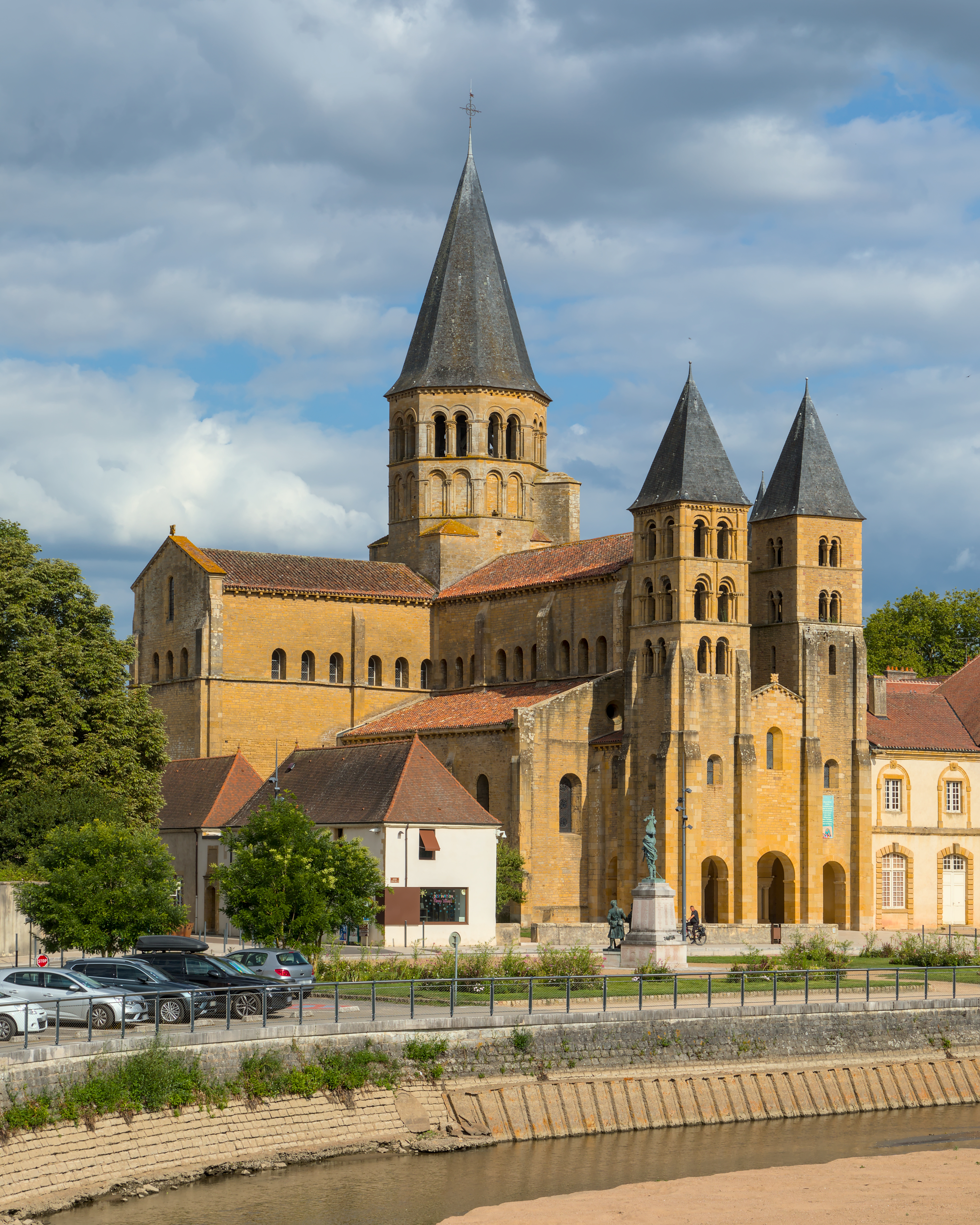
Basilica of Paray-le-Monial

The Basilica of the Sacred Heart of Paray-le-Monial (French: Basilique du Sacré-Cœur, pronounced [sakʁe kœʁ]), commonly known as Basilica of Paray-le-Monial, is a Romanesque Catholic church dedicated to the Sacred Heart of Jesus in Paray-le-Monial, Bourgogne-Franche-Comté, France.

== History ==
The basilica is a popular landmark and one of the most visited religious site in the country. The Sacred Heart became a popular worldwide devotion in large part due to the visions of Margaret Mary Alacoque, who lived and died at the monastery next to the basilica.

The church was built in the 12th century by Hugues de Semur, the most important of the Abbots of Cluny, on the site of a 10th-century monastery founded by count Lambert of Chalon. It was a small-scale version of the Abbey of Cluny. It was completed in the 14th century, although some sections were added in the 18th century or renovated in the 19th century. As a priory, it was under the authority of Cluny and was a popular pilgrimage site. It is the best conserved example of Cluniac architecture in Burgundy.

== Description ==
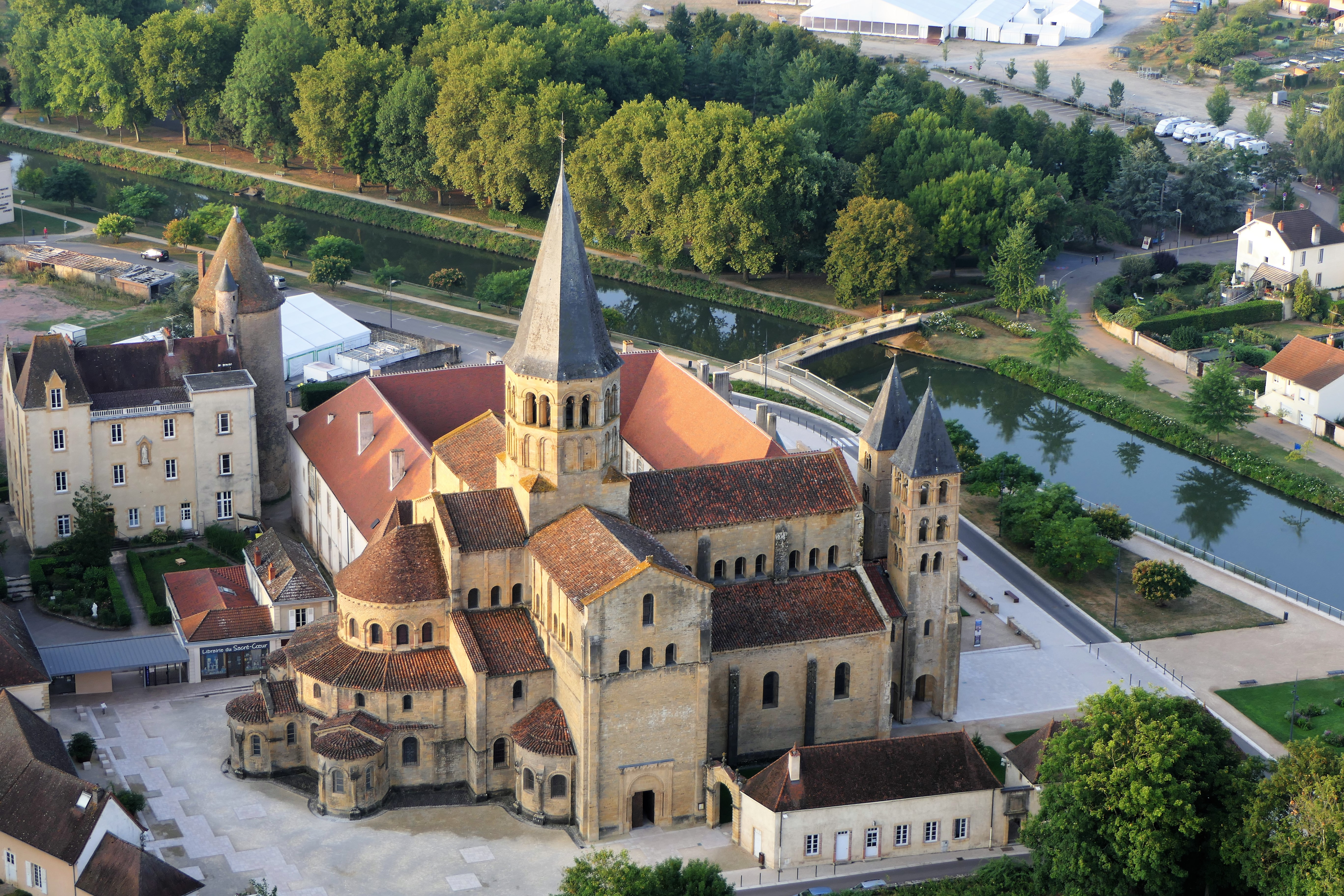
View of the basilica from above

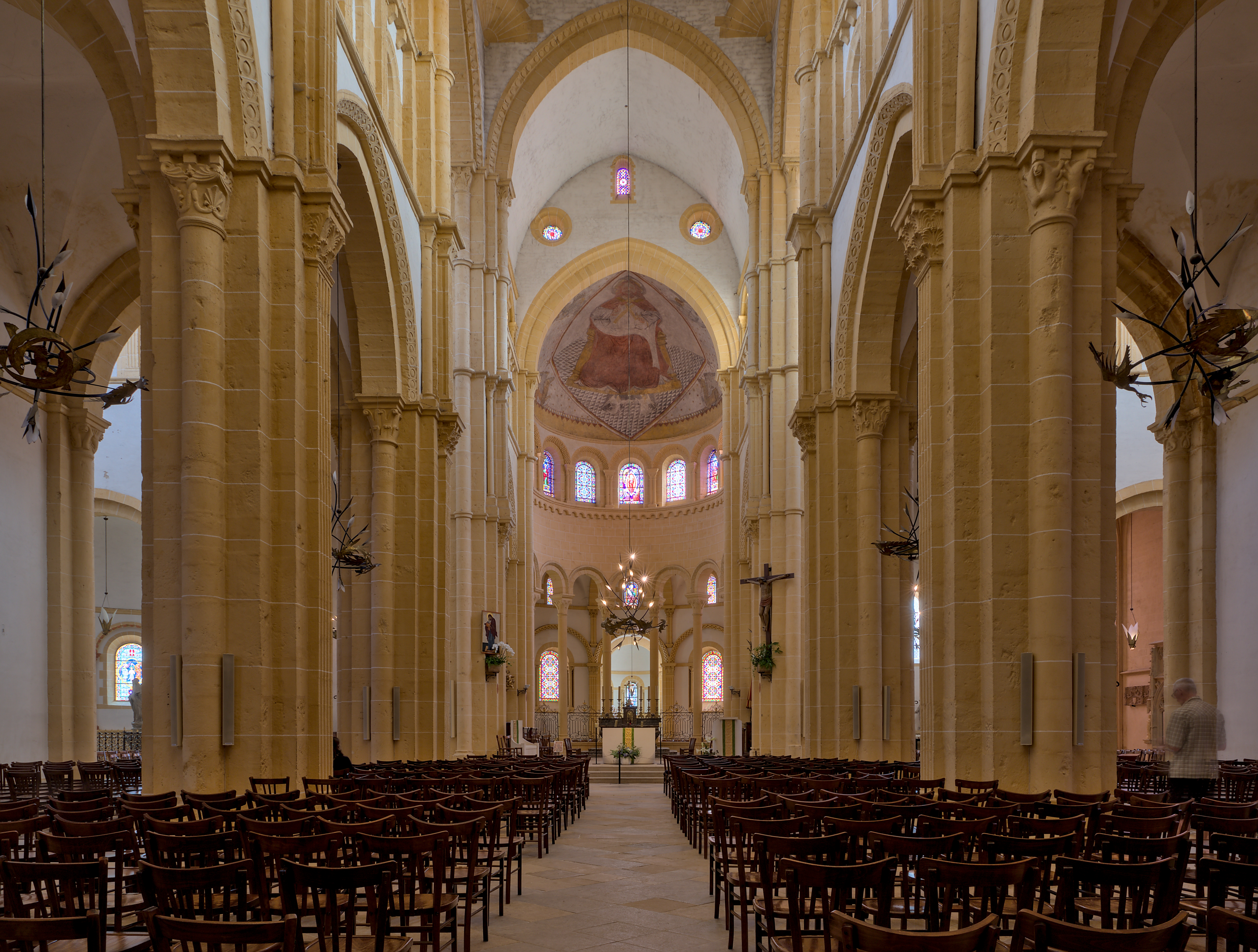
View of the nave.

The church has a rather short nave and two aisles, crossed by a single-nave transept. The choir includes a semicircular apse with an ambulatory, and three radial chapels. The edifice has an overall length of 63.5 meters, including the vestibule and the eastern chapel, and a width of 22.35 m. The nave (which is 22 m tall) and the aisles are covered by ogival barrel vaults, with, internally, the use of different height levels which was typical of Romanesque architecture. It has pre-Gothic pillars, a blind tribune and a clerestory with small windows. The capitals of the columns are generally decorated with vegetable motifs, although some feature depictions of animals or other figures. The choir houses a 14th-century fresco, rediscovered in 1935.

The exterior has a sober appearance, with massive walls. The few decorations include the portal of the transept's left arm, with flower and geometrical motifs. The crossing is surmounted by a tower with an elevation of 56 m; two smaller towers are also at the sides of the main facade.

The complex include other buildings, such as an 18th-century cloister.

== Sources ==
- Castelfranchi Vegas, L.; A. Conti (1993). L'arte medioevale in Italia e nell'Occidente europeo (in Italian).
