= Varennes-sous-Dun =

- Commune
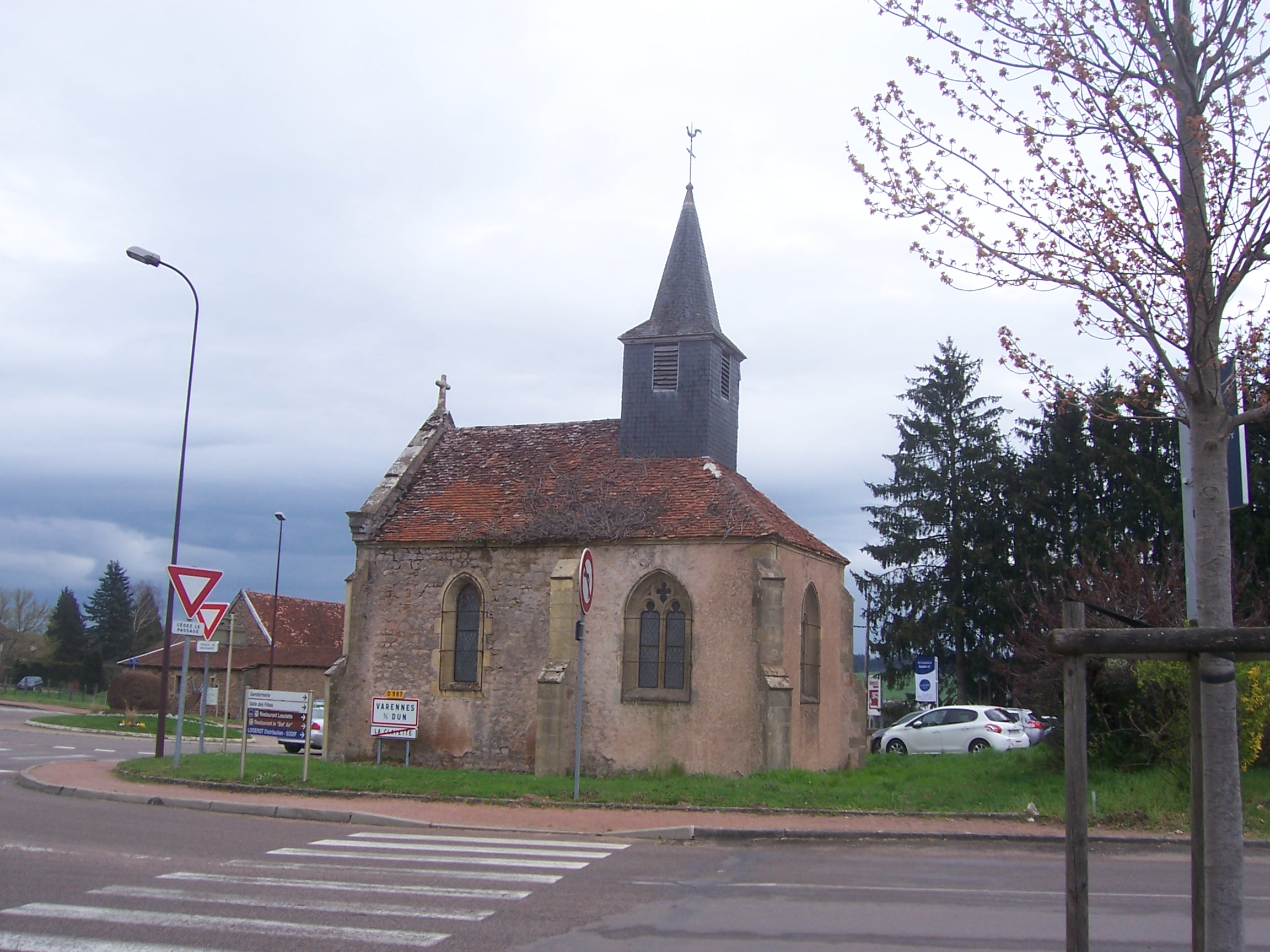
- The church in Varennes-sous-Dun
- Location of Varennes-sous-Dun
- Location within France Location within Bourgogne-Franche-Comté
- Coordinates: 46°17′25″N 4°20′02″E
- Country: France
- Region: Bourgogne-Franche-Comté
- Department: Saône-et-Loire
- Arrondissement: Charolles
- Canton: Chauffailles
- Area^{1}: 17.76 km^{2} (6.86 sq mi)
- Elevation: 300 m (980 ft)
- Highest elevation: 712 m (2,336 ft)
- Lowest elevation: 347 m (1,138 ft)
- Population (2023): 519
  - Density: 29.2/km^{2} (75.7/sq mi)
- Time zone: UTC+01:00 (CET)
  - Summer (DST): UTC+02:00 (CEST)
- INSEE/Postal code: 71559 /71800
- ^{1} French Land Register data, which excludes lakes, ponds, glaciers > 1 km^{2} (0.386 sq mi or 247 acres) and river estuaries.

Varennes-sous-Dun (French pronunciation: [vaʁɛn su dœ̃]) is a commune in the Saône-et-Loire department in the region of Bourgogne-Franche-Comté in eastern France.

== See also ==
- Communes of the Saône-et-Loire department
