= Château de La Clayette =

Castle in La Clayette, France

- Part of La Clayette
- Bourgogne-Franche-Comté
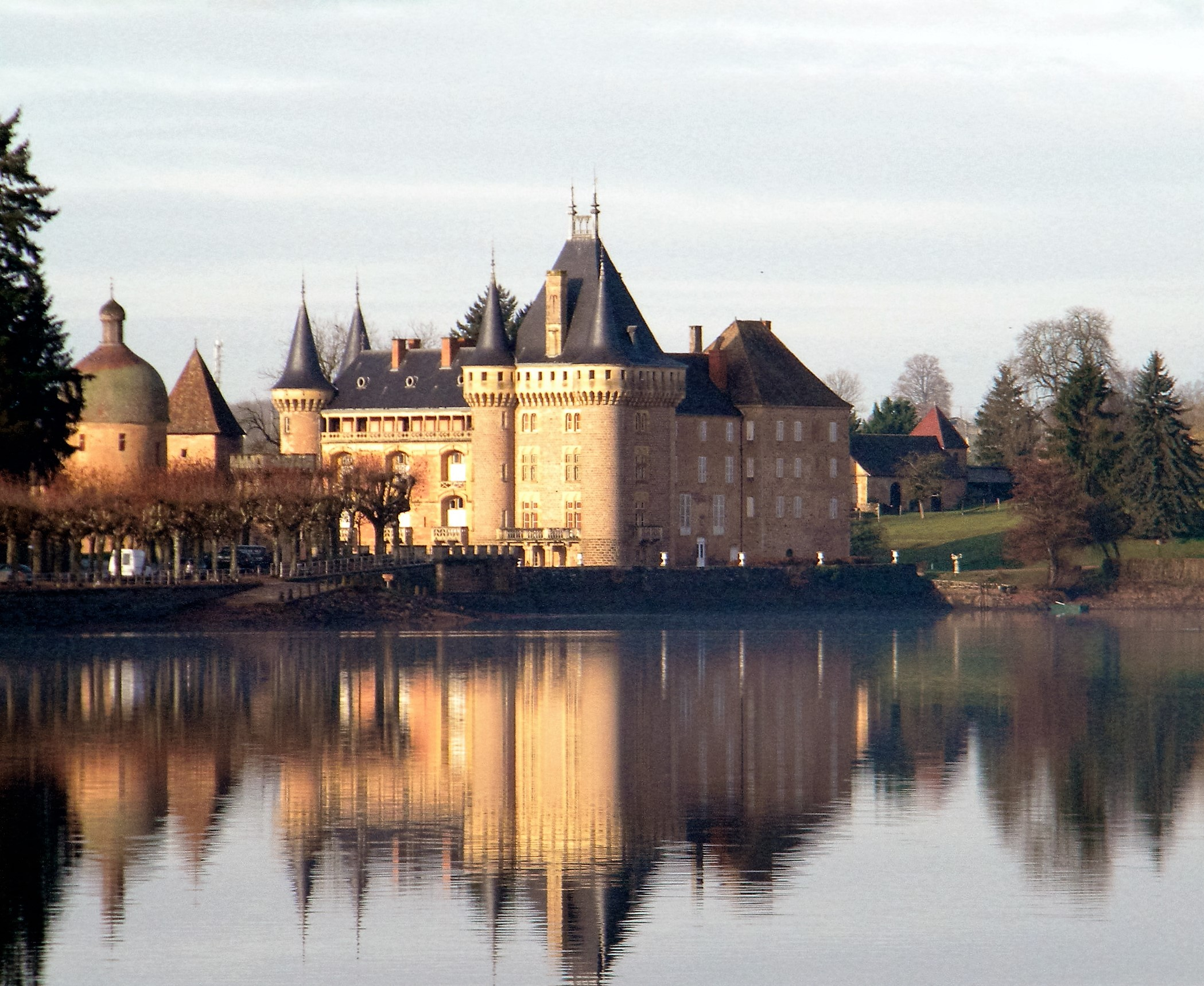
- The Château as seen from the lake

Site information
- Type: Medieval castle
- Owner: Private property

Location
- Coordinates: 46°17′26″N 4°18′20″E

Site history
- Built: 14th - 19th century
- Built by: Philibert de Lespinasse

The Château de La Clayette is a 14th- and 19th-century castle in the French town of La Clayette, situated in south-western Burgundy, in the north of the historical province of Beaujolais. It is a listed historical monument.

== Description ==
Originally, the castle was built as a fortress because of its strategic defensive location, surrounded by a water-filled moat.

It is private property and not open to the public.

== History ==
- 1307: Earliest mention as a fortified house.
- 1380: During the Hundred Years' War, Philibert de Lespinasse turned the fortified house into a castle.
- 1420: The castle belonged to Louis de Chantemerle.
- 1524: Francis I of France spent a night in the castle on his way to Lyon.
- 1632: The castle belonged to Paul of the House of Damas, one of France's oldest noble families.
- 1703: By inheritance, the castle went to the Dyo family after the death of Jean-Léonard de Damas.
- 1722: Bernard de Noblet bought the castle, whose descendants are still owners.

It was expanded to its current size in the 19th century.

== Gallery ==
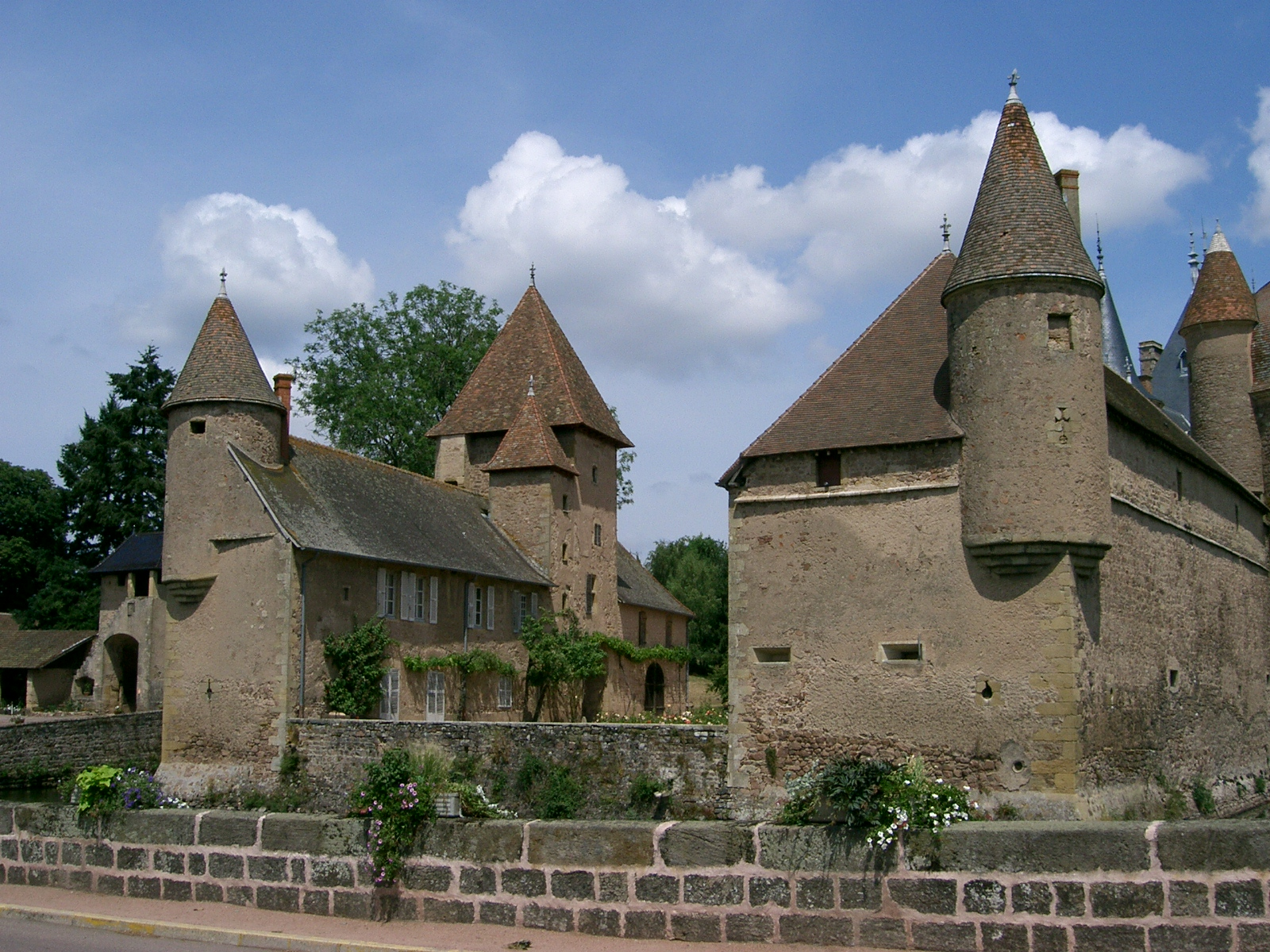

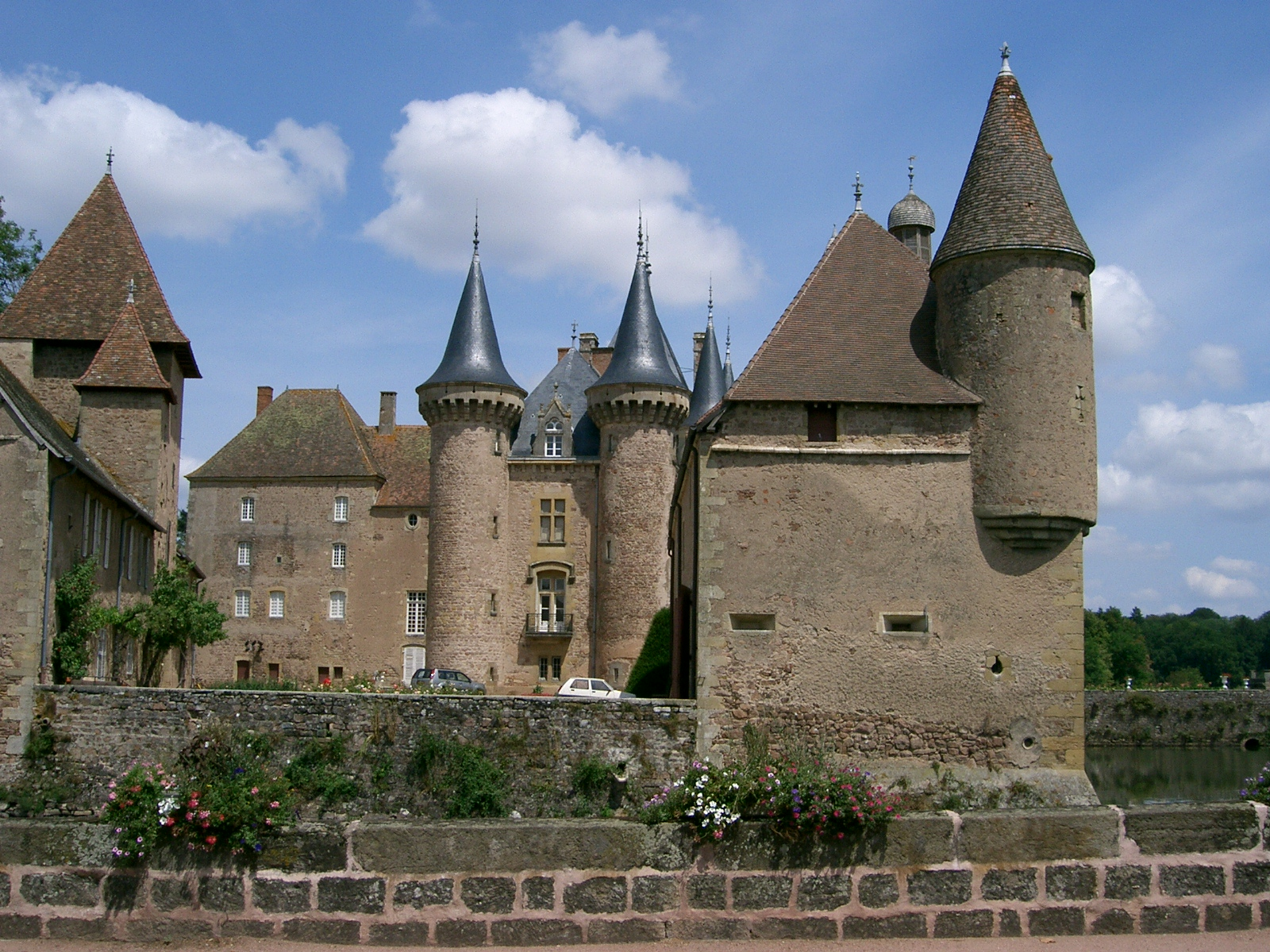

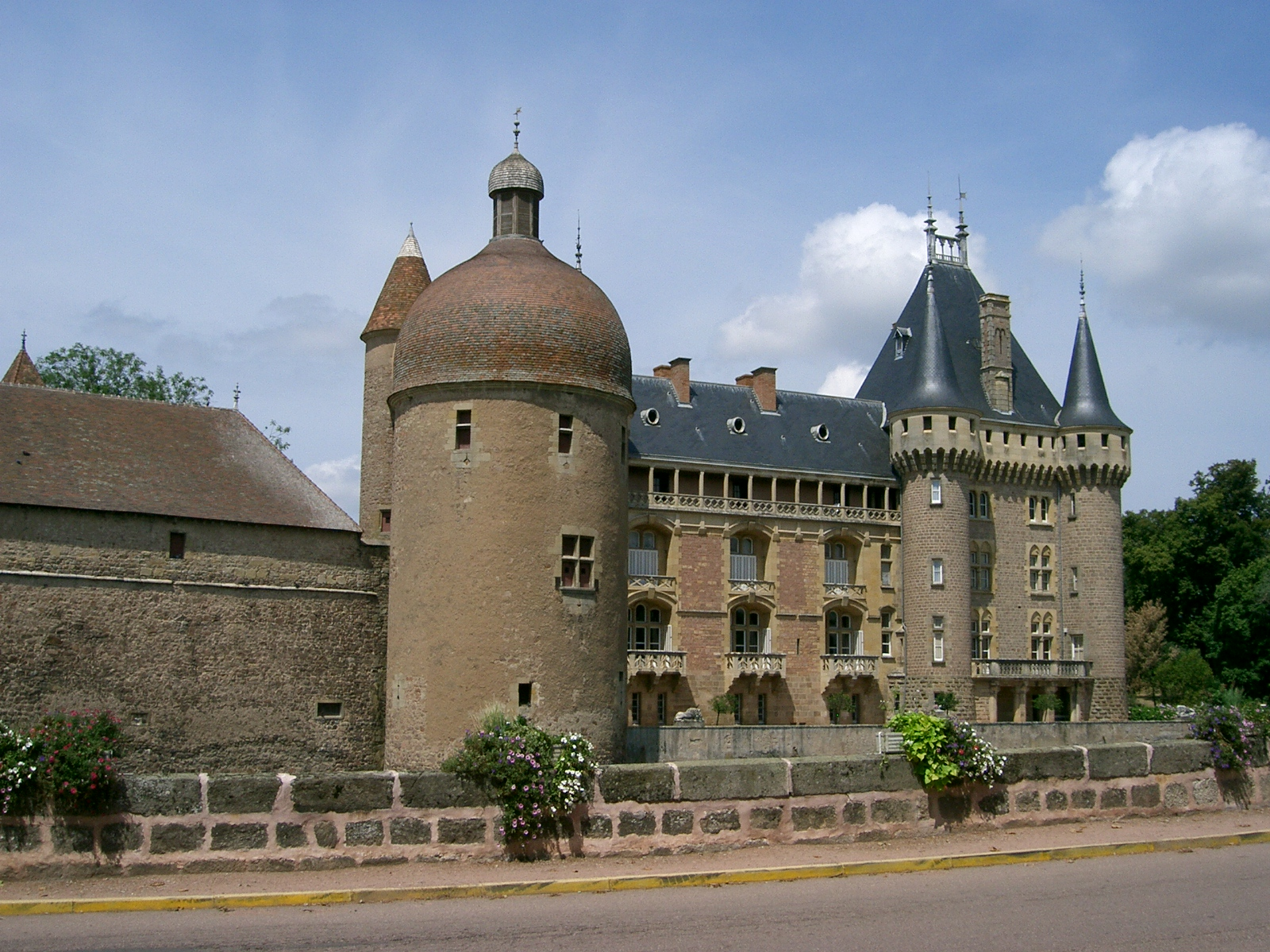

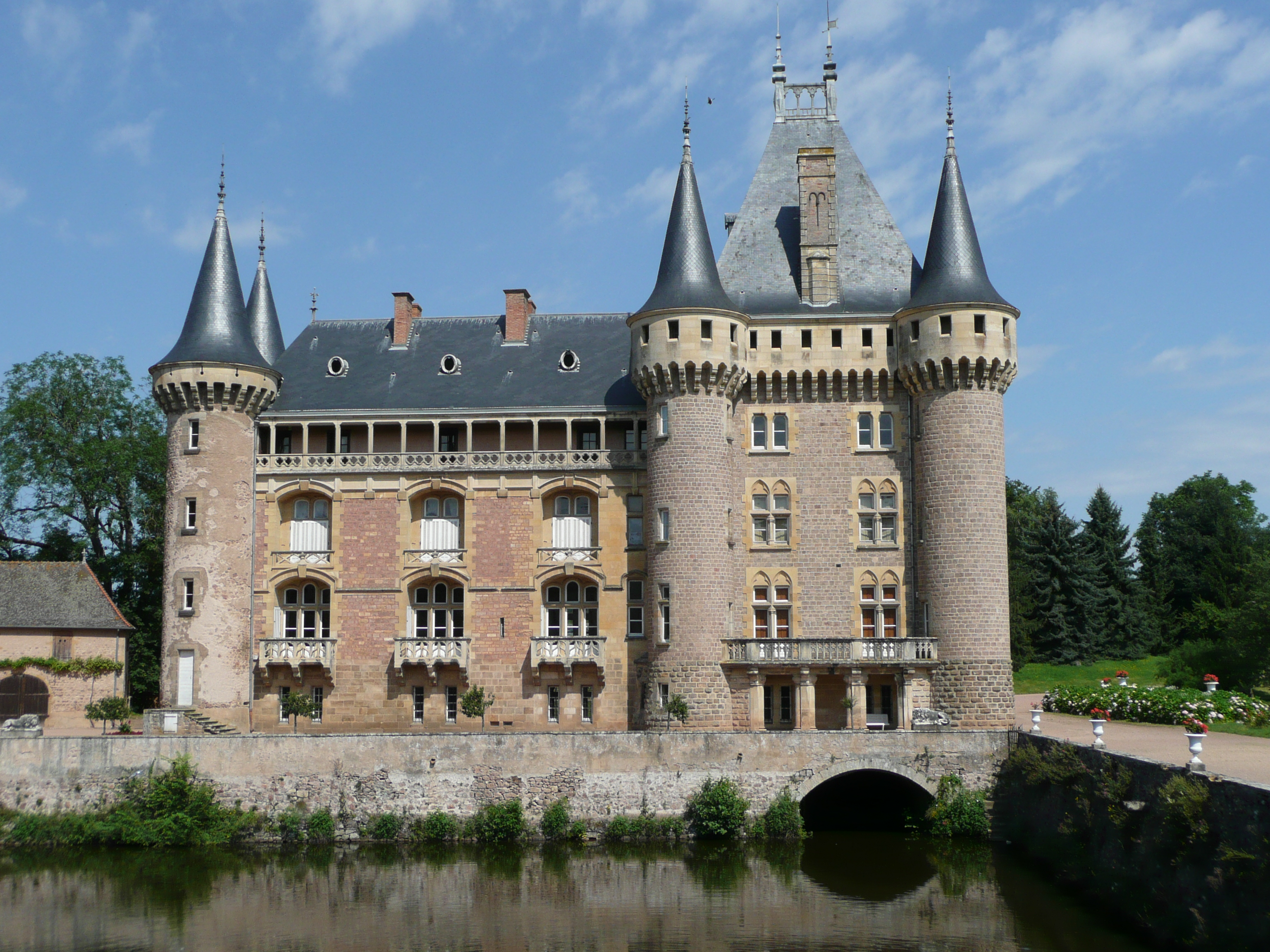

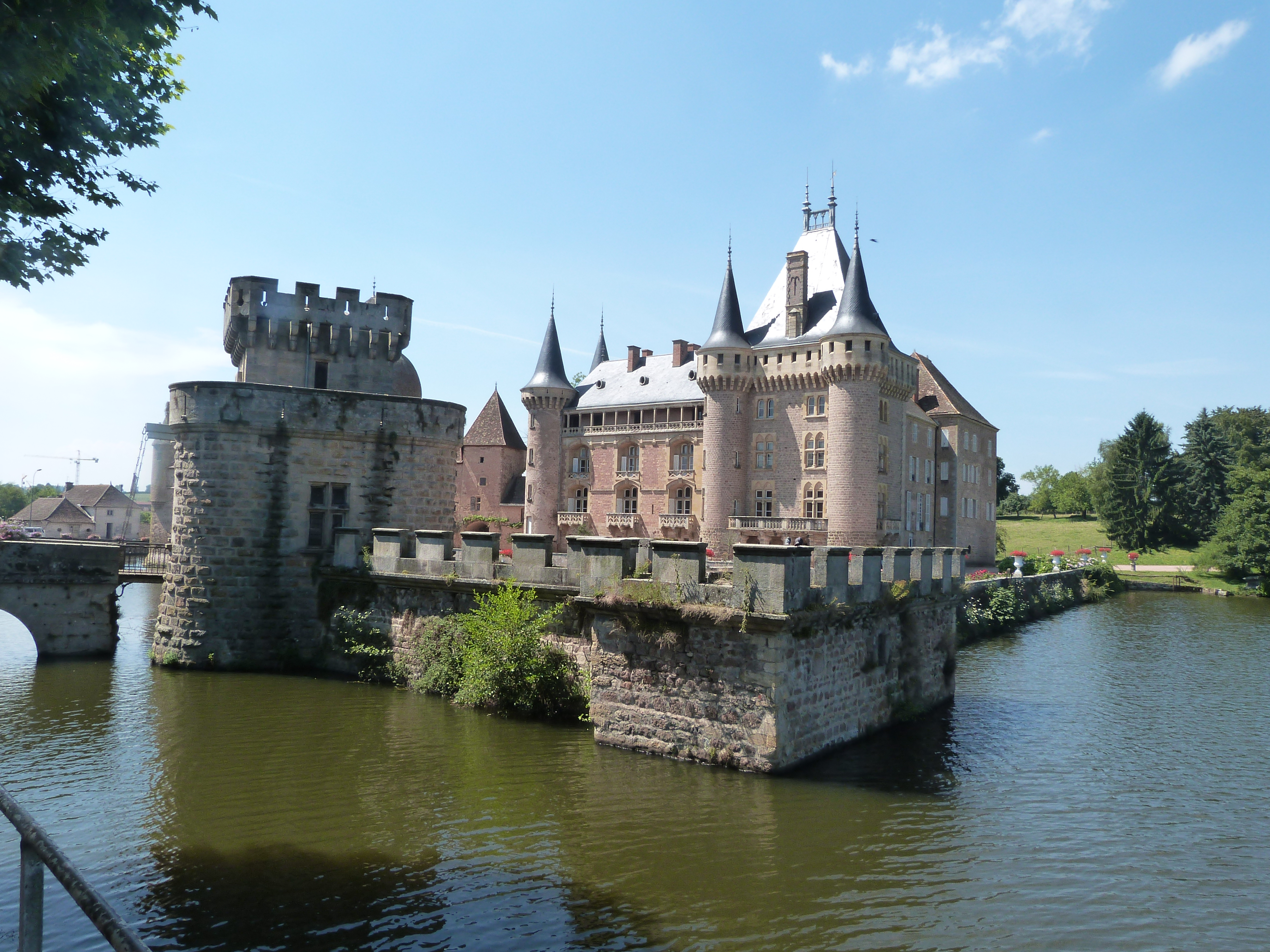

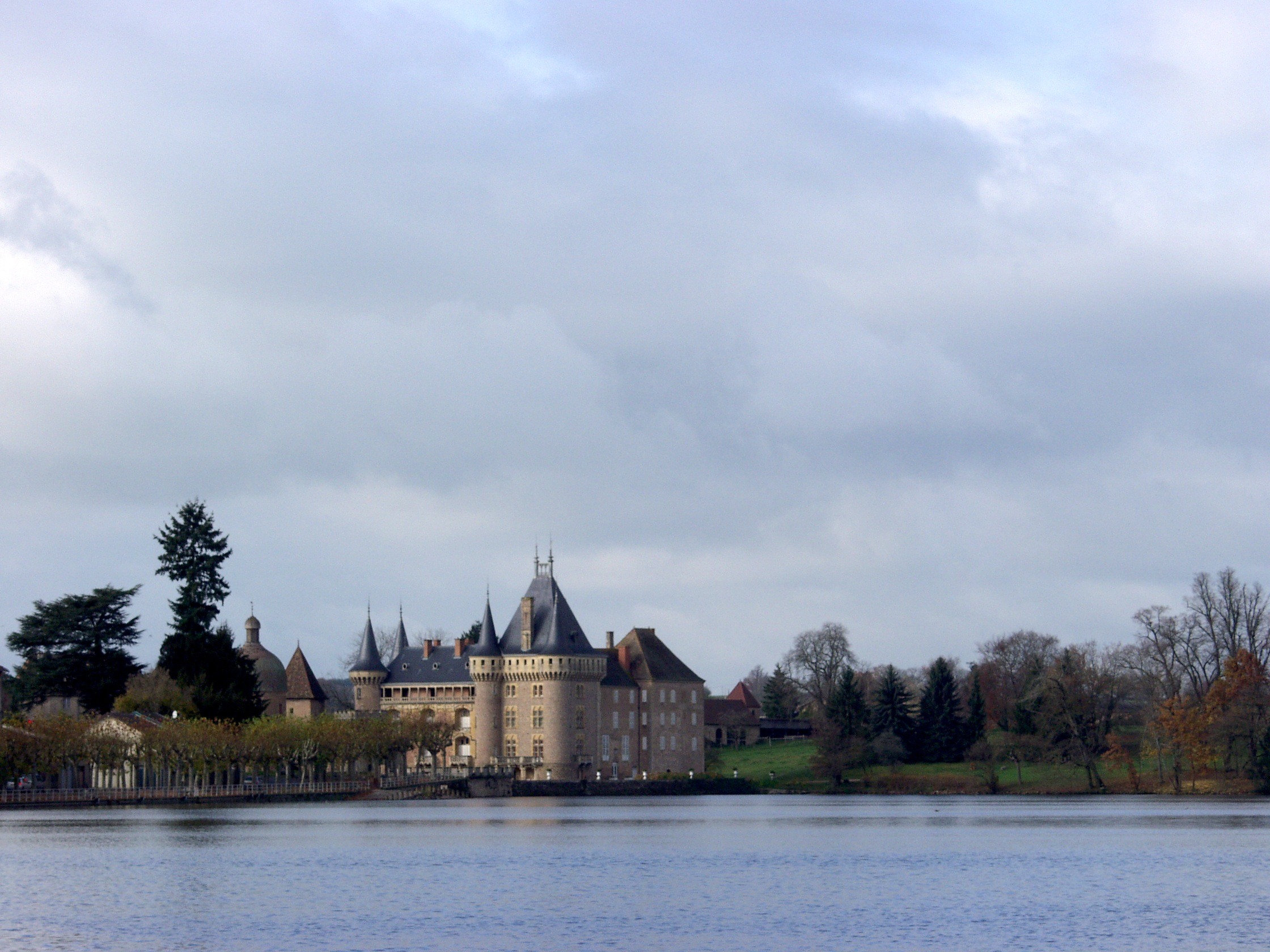

== See also ==
- List of castles in France
