= Burgundy =

Historical region in France

Burgundy Bourgogne
- Historical region
- Flag Coat of arms

- Coordinates: 47°00′N 4°30′E
- Country: France
- Dissolved: 1 January 2016
- Prefecture: Dijon
- Departments: 4: Côte-d'Or (21); Nièvre (58); Saône-et-Loire (71); Yonne (89)

Government
  - President: François Patriat (PS)

Area
  - Total: 31,582 km^{2} (12,194 sq mi)

Population (2008-01-01)
  - Total: 1,631,000
  - Density: 51.64/km^{2} (133.8/sq mi)

GDP
  - Total: €58.023 billion (2024)
  - Per capita: €35,795 (2024)
- Time zone: UTC+01:00 (CET)
  - Summer (DST): UTC+02:00 (CEST)
- ISO 3166 code: FR-D
- NUTS Region: FR2
- Website: www.xn--rgion-bourgogne-bnb.fr (archive)

Burgundy (/ˈbɜːrɡəndi/ BUR-gən-dee; French: Bourgogne [buʁɡɔɲ]; Burgundian: Bregogne) is a historical region in France, broadly corresponding to the territory of the former administrative region of the same name, which existed from 1982 to 2015 before it was merged on 1 January 2016 into Bourgogne-Franche-Comté. Its capital is Dijon.

Named after the Burgundians, Burgundy was historically associated with several political entities, most notably the Duchy of Burgundy, which emerged in the early Middle Ages and later became one of the most important principalities of the Kingdom of France. In the 14th and 15th centuries the duchy formed the core of the Valois-Burgundian State, a major power in late medieval western Europe.

Burgundy is known for its historical monuments, monastic heritage, and wine, especially Burgundy wine. Major religious centres included Cluny, Cîteaux, and Vézelay, while Dijon developed into an important centre of politics, culture, art, and learning.

== Etymology ==
Burgundy is named for the Burgundians, an East Germanic people who moved westwards beyond the Rhine during the late Roman period. The name Burgundy has historically denoted numerous political entities. It first emerged in the 9th century as one of the successors of the ancient Kingdom of the Burgundians, which after its conquest in 532 had formed a constituent part of the Frankish Empire.

Since the inception of the French departmental system in 1790, Burgundy has referred to the geographic area comprising the four departments of Côte-d'Or, Saône-et-Loire, Yonne, and Nièvre.

== History ==
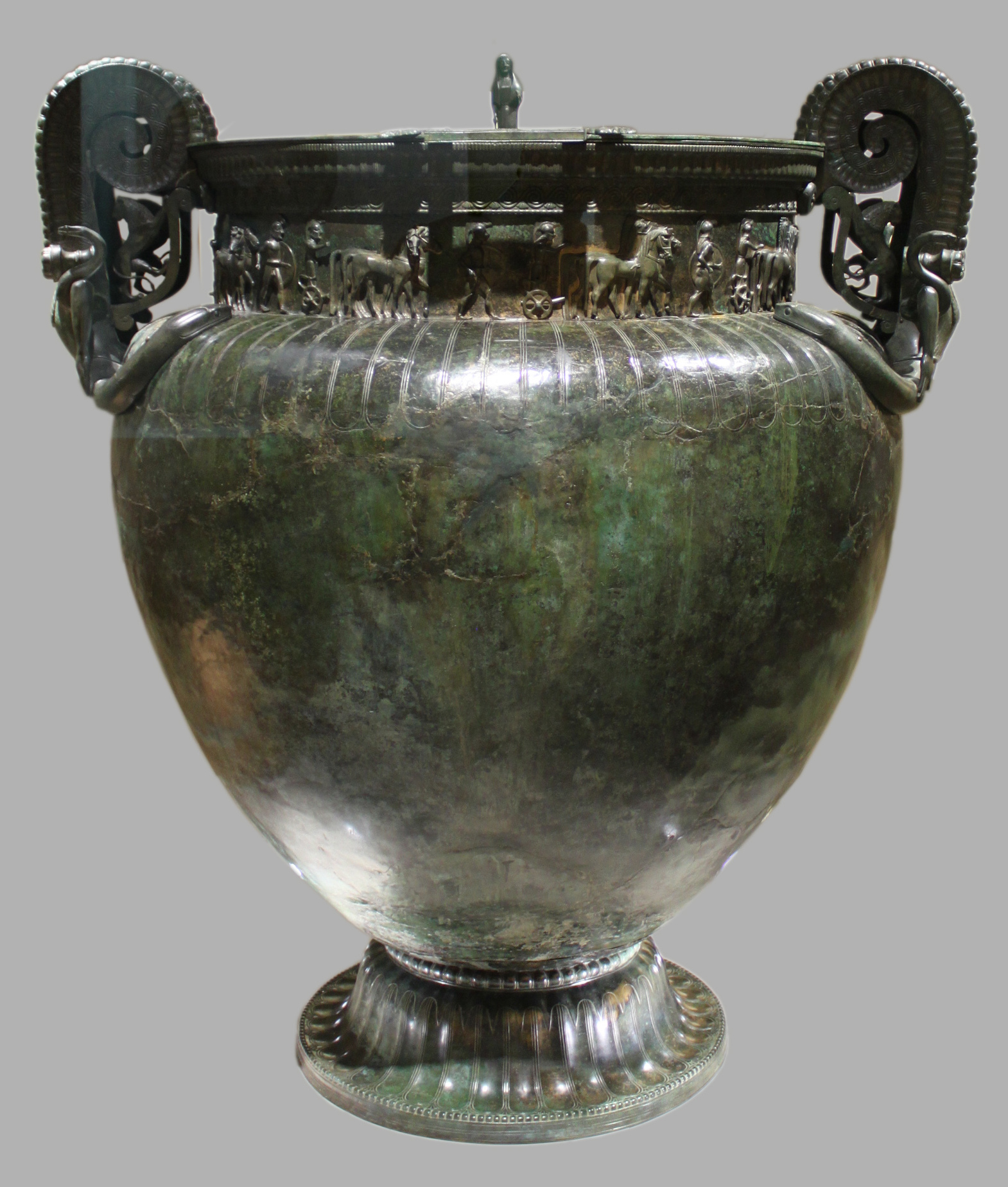
The Vix Krater, a Greek wine-mixing vessel found in the Vix Grave

Coat of arms of the second Duchy of Burgundy and later of the province

The first recorded inhabitants of the area that was to become Burgundy were various tribes of Gallic Celts, the most prominent of which were the semi-republican Aedui, who were eventually incorporated into the Roman Empire following the Gaulish defeat in the Battle of Alesia. Gallo-Roman culture flourished during the Roman period.

During the 4th century, the Burgundians, a Germanic people who may have originated on the Baltic island of Bornholm, settled in the western Alps. They founded the Kingdom of the Burgundians, which was conquered in the 6th century by another Germanic tribe, the Franks.

Map of France showing Burgundy and provincial boundaries in 1789

Under Frankish dominion, the Kingdom of Burgundy continued for several centuries.

The modern Burgundy encompasses only the north-western parts of the ancient Kingdom of the Burgundians, which had a much wider territorial scope. In 843, under the Treaty of Verdun, the old Burgundian lands were divided, with the north-western regions being assigned to the West Frankish Kingdom. Since the beginning of the 10th century, those regions were organized as the Duchy of Burgundy, remaining under the sovereignty of the Kingdom of France. Since 1004, the House of Burgundy, a cadet branch of the French royal House of Capet, ruled over the duchy, which roughly conformed to the borders and territory of the later administrative region of Burgundy. Upon the extinction of the Burgundian male line, the duchy reverted to the King of France and the House of Valois.

Later, the region was divided between the Duchy of Burgundy (to the west) and the Free County of Burgundy (to the east). The Duchy of Burgundy is the better known of the two, later becoming the French Province of Burgundy, while the County of Burgundy became the French province of Franche-Comté.

Burgundy's modern existence is rooted in the dissolution of the Frankish Empire. In the 880s, there were four Burgundies: the Duchy, the County, and the kingdoms of Upper Burgundy and Lower Burgundy.

During the Middle Ages, Burgundy was home to some of the most important Western churches and monasteries, including those of Cluny, Cîteaux, and Vézelay. Cluny, founded in 910, exerted a strong influence in Europe for centuries. The first Cistercian abbey was founded in 1098 in Cîteaux. Over the next century, hundreds of Cistercian abbeys were founded throughout Europe, in a large part due to the charisma and influence of Bernard of Clairvaux. The Abbey of Fontenay, a UNESCO World Heritage Site, is today the best-preserved Cistercian abbey in Burgundy. The Abbey of Vézelay, also a UNESCO World Heritage Site, is still a starting point for pilgrimages to Santiago de Compostela. Cluny was almost totally destroyed during the French Revolution.

During the Hundred Years' War, King John II of France gave the duchy to his youngest son, Philip the Bold. The duchy soon became a major rival to the crown. The court in Dijon outshone the French court both economically and culturally. Philip the Bold's grandson Philip the Good acquired Namur, Hainaut, Brabant, and Holland in modern Belgium and the Netherlands.

Following the marriage of Philip of Valois and Margaret III of Flanders, the Duchy of Burgundy was integrated into the emerging Valois-Burgundian State, alongside parts of the Low Countries which would become collectively known as the Burgundian Netherlands. Upon further acquisitions of the Free County of Burgundy and various other domains, the House of Valois-Burgundy came into possession of numerous French and imperial fiefs stretching from the western Alps to the North Sea, in some ways reminiscent of the old Middle Frankish realm of Lotharingia.

The Valois-Burgundian State, in its own right, was one of the largest composite polities that existed in western Europe during the late medieval era. It was regarded as one of the major regional powers of the 14th and 15th centuries. The Dukes of Burgundy were among the wealthiest and the most powerful princes in Europe and were sometimes called "Grand Dukes of the West". Through its possessions the Burgundian State was a major European centre of trade and commerce.

Military flag of the Burgundian State during the reign of Charles the Bold

The extinction of the dynasty in the late 15th century led to the absorption of the Duchy itself into the French crown lands by king Louis XI, while the bulk of the Burgundian possessions in the Low Countries passed to Duke Charles the Bold's daughter, Mary, and her Habsburg descendants. Thus the partition of the Burgundian heritage marked the beginning of the centuries-long French–Habsburg rivalry and played a pivotal role in European politics long after Burgundy had lost its role as an independent political identity.

In 1477, at the battle of Nancy during the Burgundian Wars, the last duke Charles the Bold was killed in battle, and the Duchy itself was annexed by France and became a province. However, the northern part of the empire was taken by the Austrian Habsburgs.

=== Province of Burgundy ===
From 1482 until 1790, the former Duchy of Burgundy was one of the provinces of France. It was thus the Province of Burgundy. During this time some areas that had previously been under the control of the Savoyard state were brought under the control of France and added to the province of Burgundy.

During the early modern period, the Duchy of Burgundy was assigned as an appanage to various members of the French royal dynasty. As a result of later administrative reforms during the republican era, the old Burgundian province was abolished and divided into several departments.

With the French Revolution at the end of the 18th century, the administrative units of the provinces disappeared, but were reconstituted as regions during the Fifth Republic in the 1970s. The modern-day administrative region comprises most of the former duchy.

In 2016, Burgundy and the historical region of Franche-Comté merged for administrative purposes into the new region of Bourgogne-Franche-Comté.

== Geography ==
Map of Burgundy

The region of Burgundy is both larger than the old Duchy of Burgundy and smaller than the area ruled by the Dukes of Burgundy, from the modern Netherlands to the border of Auvergne. Today, Burgundy is made up of the old provinces:

- Burgundy: Côte-d'Or, Saône-et-Loire, and southern half of Yonne. This corresponds to the old duchy of Burgundy (later called province of Burgundy). However, the old county of Burgundy (later called province of Franche-Comté) is not included inside the Burgundy region, but it makes up the Franche-Comté region. Also, a small part of the duchy of Burgundy (province of Burgundy) is now inside the Champagne-Ardenne region.
- Nivernais: now the department of Nièvre.
- the northern half of Yonne is a territory that was not part of Burgundy (at least not since the 11th century), and was a frontier between Champagne, Île-de-France, and Orléanais, being part of each of these provinces at different times in history.

=== Major communities ===
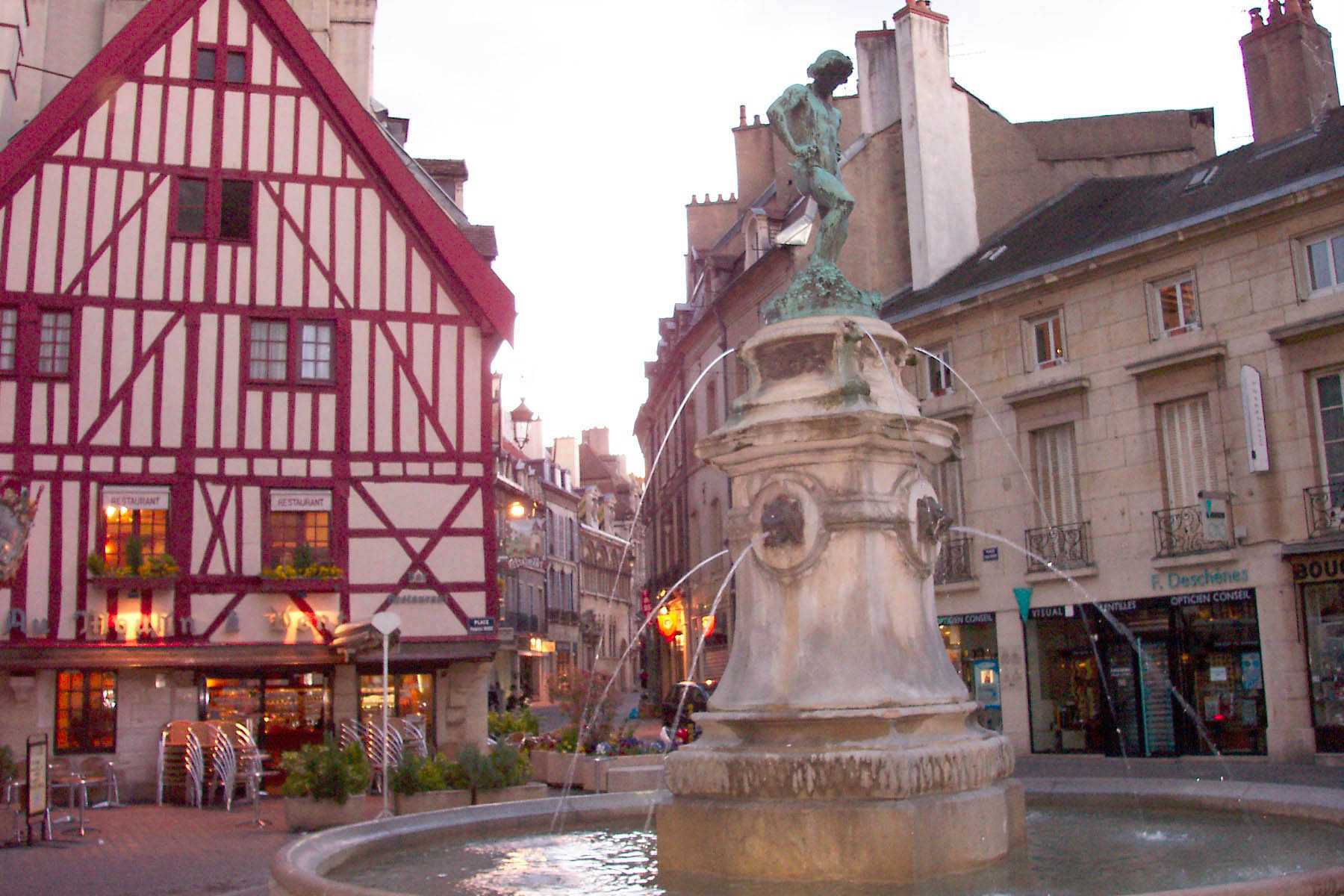
Dijon, Place François-Rude

- Autun
- Auxerre
- Avallon
- Beaune
- Chalon-sur-Saône
- Dijon
- Le Creusot
- Mâcon
- Montceau-les-Mines
- Nevers
- Paray-le-Monial
- Sens

== Climate ==
The climate of this region is essentially oceanic (Cfb in Köppen classification), with a continental influence (sometimes called a "half-continental climate").

== Politics ==
The regional council of Burgundy was the legislative assembly of the region, until its merger to form the regional council of Bourgogne-Franche-Comté.

== Culture ==
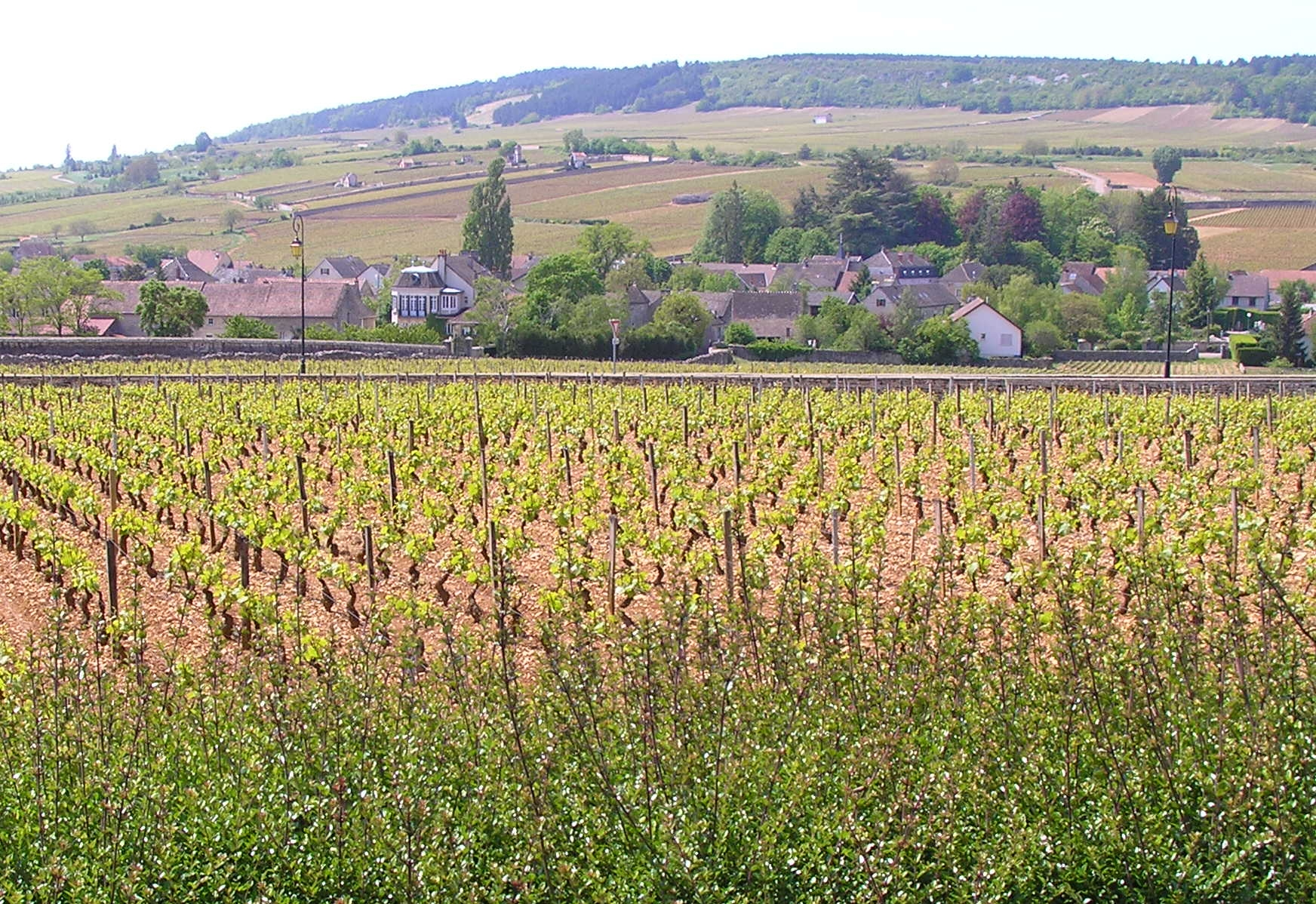
Chardonnay vineyards near the town of Meursault

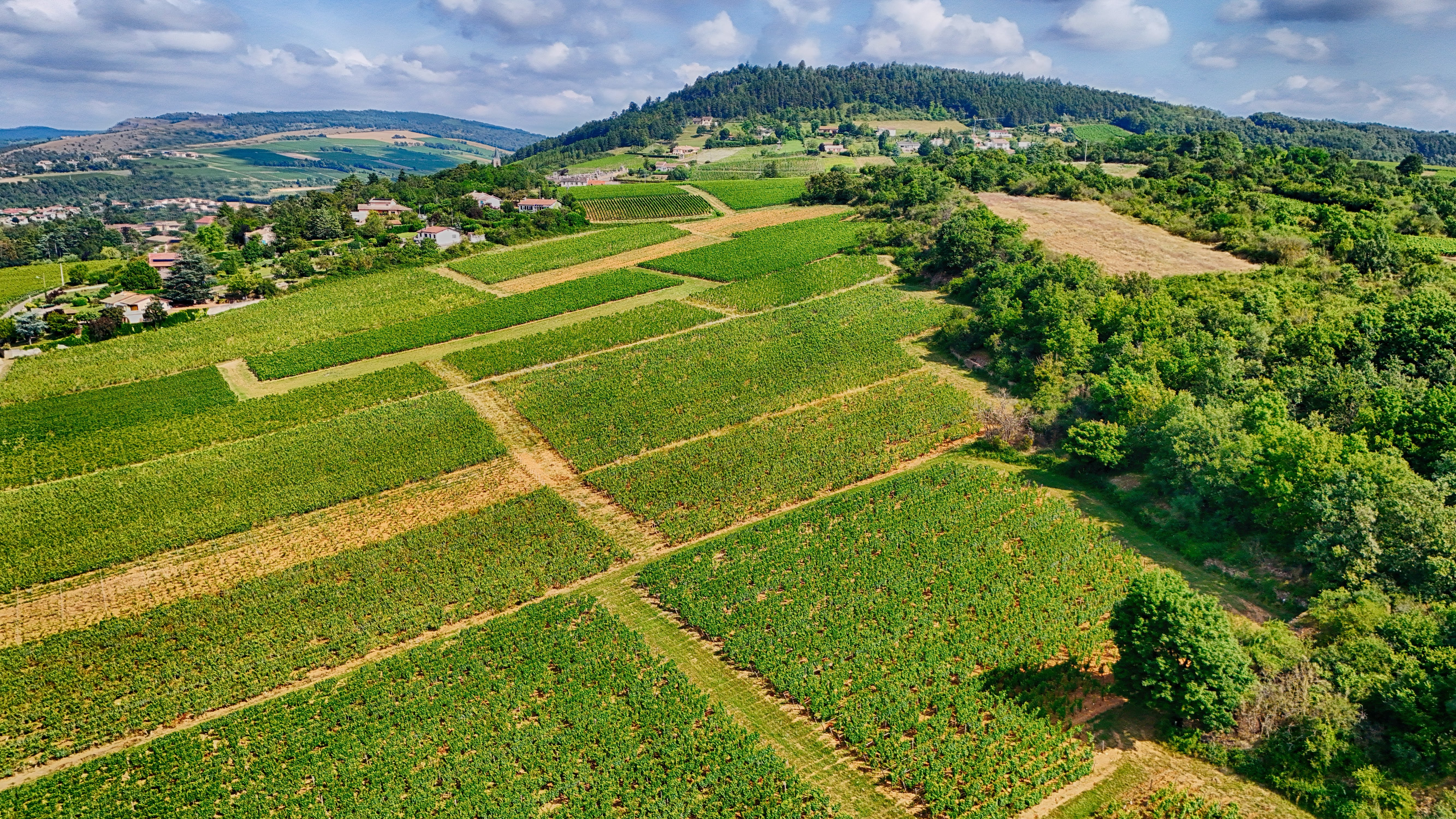
Vineyards in La Roche-Vineuse

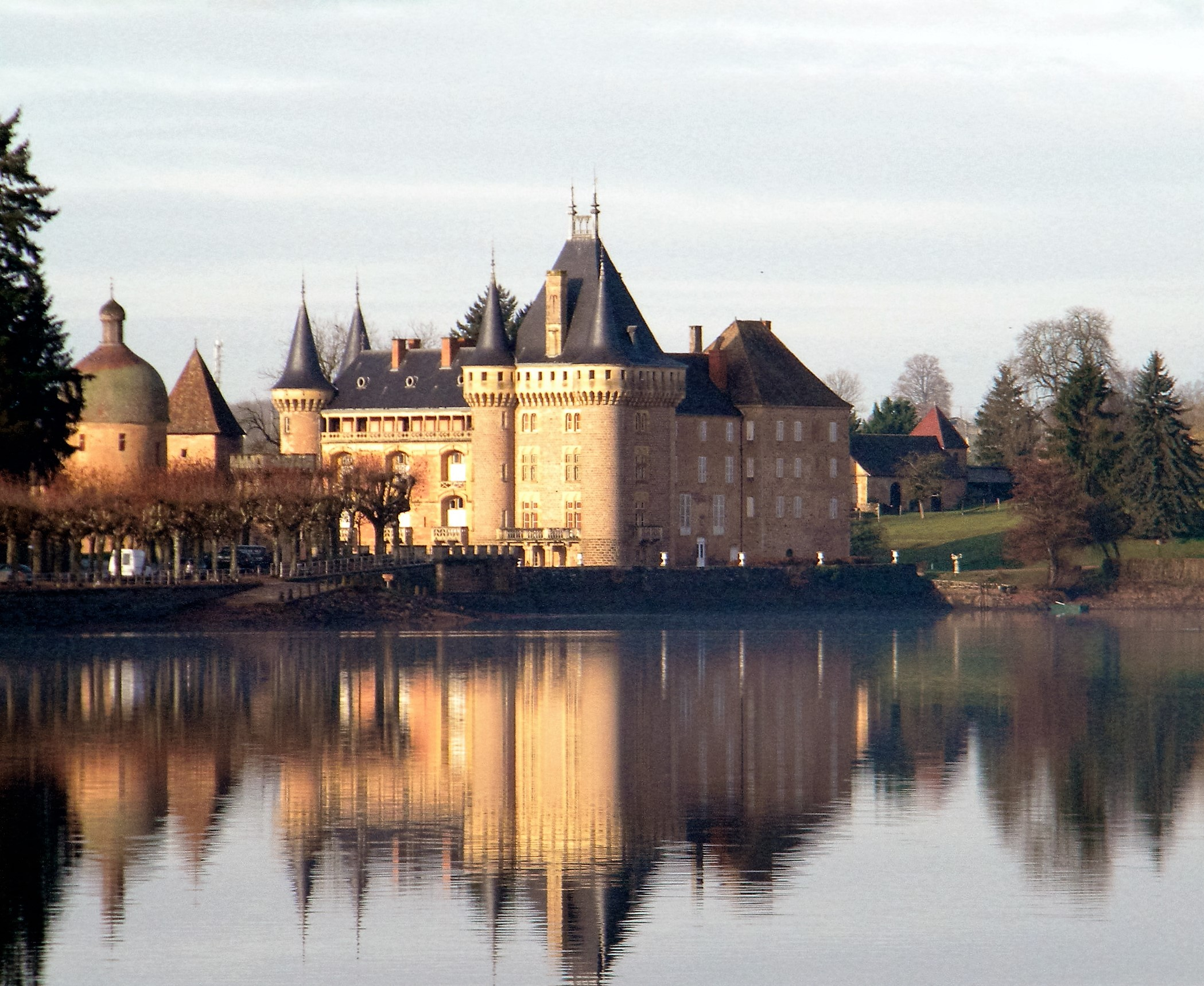
Château de La Clayette

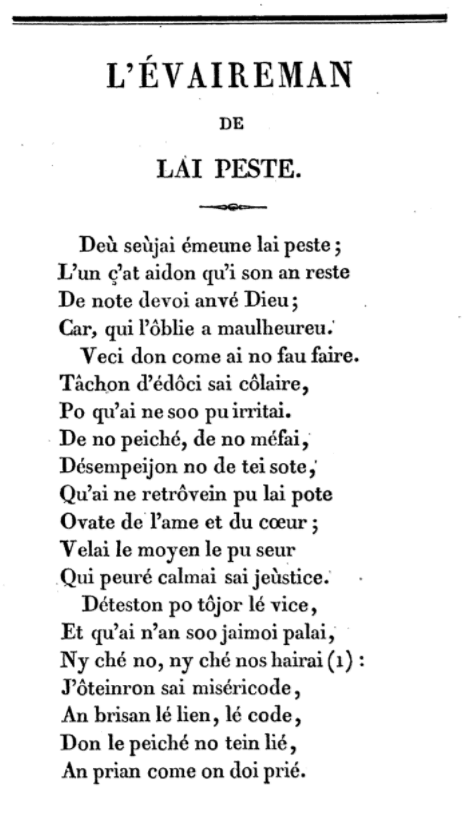
Poem in Burgundian dialect

Burgundy is one of France's main wine-producing areas. It is well known for both its red and white wines, mostly made from Pinot noir and Chardonnay grapes, respectively, although other grape varieties can be found, including Gamay, Aligote, Pinot blanc, and Sauvignon blanc. The region is divided into the Côte-d'Or, where the most expensive and prized Burgundies are found, and Beaujolais, Chablis, the Côte Chalonnaise and Mâcon. The reputation and quality of the top wines, together with the fact that they are often produced in small quantities, has led to high demand and high prices, with some Burgundies ranking among the most expensive wines in the world.

With regard to cuisine, the region is famous for Dijon mustard, Charolais beef, Bresse chicken, the Burgundian dishes coq au vin and beef bourguignon, and époisses cheese.

Tourist sites of Burgundy include the Rock of Solutré, the Hospices de Beaune, the Ducal Palace in Dijon, and many Renaissance and mediaeval châteaus, castles, churches and abbeys.

Earlier, the southeastern part of Burgundy was heavily industrial, with coal mines near Montceau-les-Mines and iron foundries and crystal works in Le Creusot. These industries declined in the second half of the twentieth century.

The local dialect is known as Burgundian (Bourguignon); it is an Oïl language similar to Standard French but with some Franco-Provençal and Dutch influence.

== See also ==
- Upper Burgundy
- Lower Burgundy
