= Paray-le-Monial =

- Commune
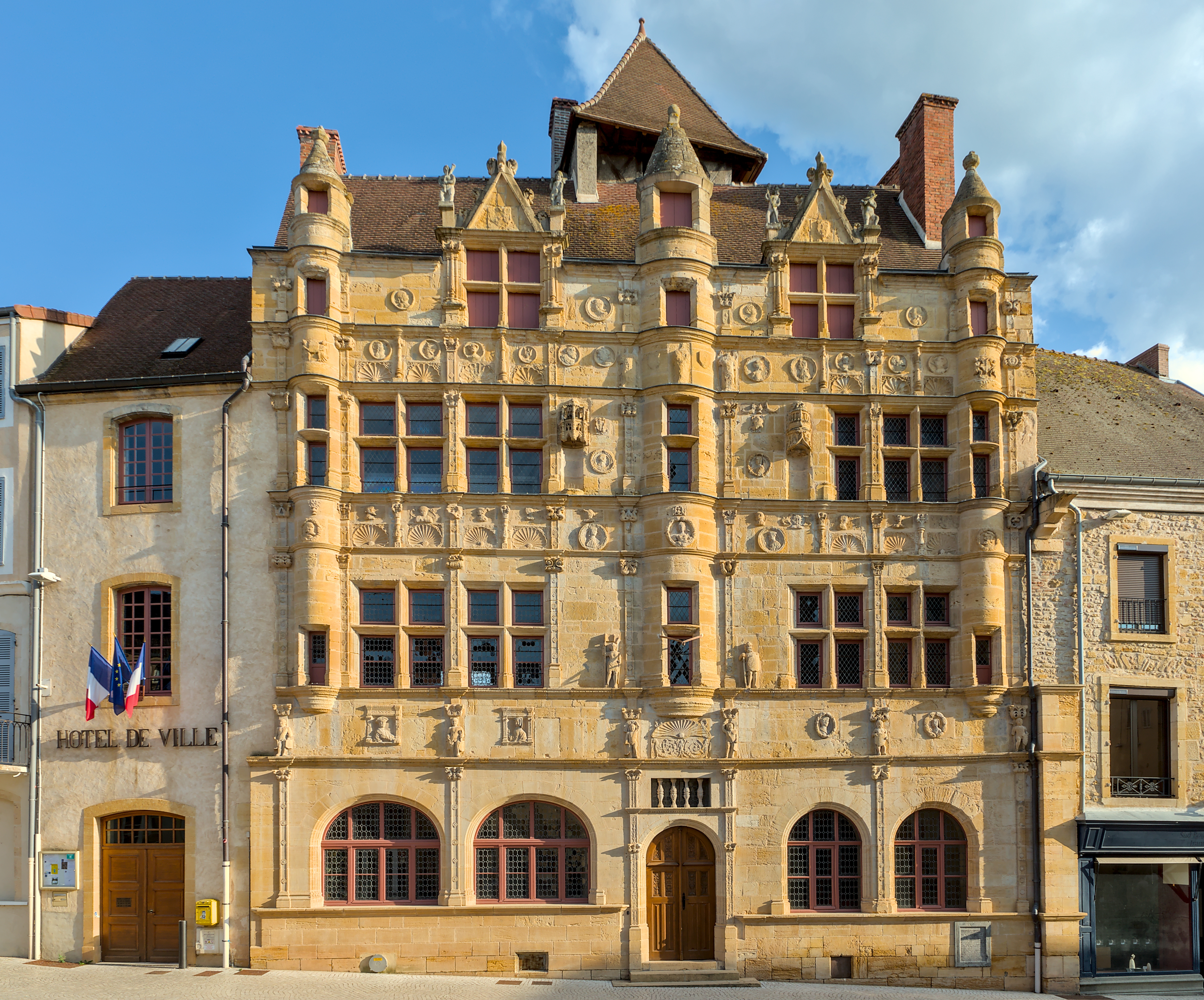
- Hôtel de Ville in Paray-le-Monial

- Coat of arms
- Location of Paray-le-Monial
- Location within France Location within Bourgogne-Franche-Comté
- Coordinates: 46°27′07″N 4°07′13″E
- Country: France
- Region: Bourgogne-Franche-Comté
- Department: Saône-et-Loire
- Arrondissement: Charolles
- Canton: Paray-le-Monial

Government
  - Mayor (2020–2026): Jean-Marc Nesme
- Area^{1}: 25.20 km^{2} (9.73 sq mi)
- Elevation: 245 m (804 ft)
- Highest elevation: 304 m (997 ft)
- Lowest elevation: 234 m (768 ft)
- Population (2023): 9,291
  - Density: 368.7/km^{2} (954.9/sq mi)
- Time zone: UTC+01:00 (CET)
  - Summer (DST): UTC+02:00 (CEST)
- INSEE/Postal code: 71342 /71600
- ^{1} French Land Register data, which excludes lakes, ponds, glaciers > 1 km^{2} (0.386 sq mi or 247 acres) and river estuaries.

Paray-le-Monial [paʁɛ lə mɔnjal] is a commune in the Saône-et-Loire department in the region of Bourgogne-Franche-Comté in eastern France. Since 2004, Paray-le-Monial has been part of the Charolais-Brionnais region. Its inhabitants are called Parodiens and Parodiennes.

== Geography ==
Paray-le-Monial is located in the southwest of the Saône-et-Loire Département, in the heart of the Charolais countryside, in a plain bounded by the Brionnais upland, the rivers Loire, l'Arroux and the Bourbince.

The roughly parallel Bourbince River and the canal du Centre traverse the city from the southeast to the northwest.

Among the elements that form the city, as it has developed over its history, are the upland near the Bourbince River, the priory and basilica, a rectangular town center with very dense housing, national highway N79, which crosses the Bourbince River east and west of the town center, a newer part of town located north of the town center, the Bellevue residential area to the southwest, and several suburbs.

== History ==
Paray (Paredum; Parodium) existed before the monks who gave it its surname of Le Monial: when Count Lambert of Chalon, together with his wife Adelaide and his friend Mayeul de Cluny, founded a Benedictine priory there in 973, the borough had already been constituted, with its ædiles and communal privileges. At that time an ancient temple was dedicated to the Mother of God (Charter of Paray). The Cluny monks were lords of the town from 999 until 1789.

Because of its historical association with Saint Margaret Mary Alacoque and Saint Claude de la Colombière, it has been called the "city of the Heart of Jesus".

== Population ==
Historical population
Year	Pop.	±% p.a.
1968	10,716	—
1975	11,545	+1.07%
1982	10,639	−1.16%
1990	9,859	−0.95%
1999	9,191	−0.78%
2007	9,138	−0.07%
2012	9,029	−0.24%
2017	9,189	+0.35%
2023	9,291	+0.18%
Source: INSEE

== Main sights ==
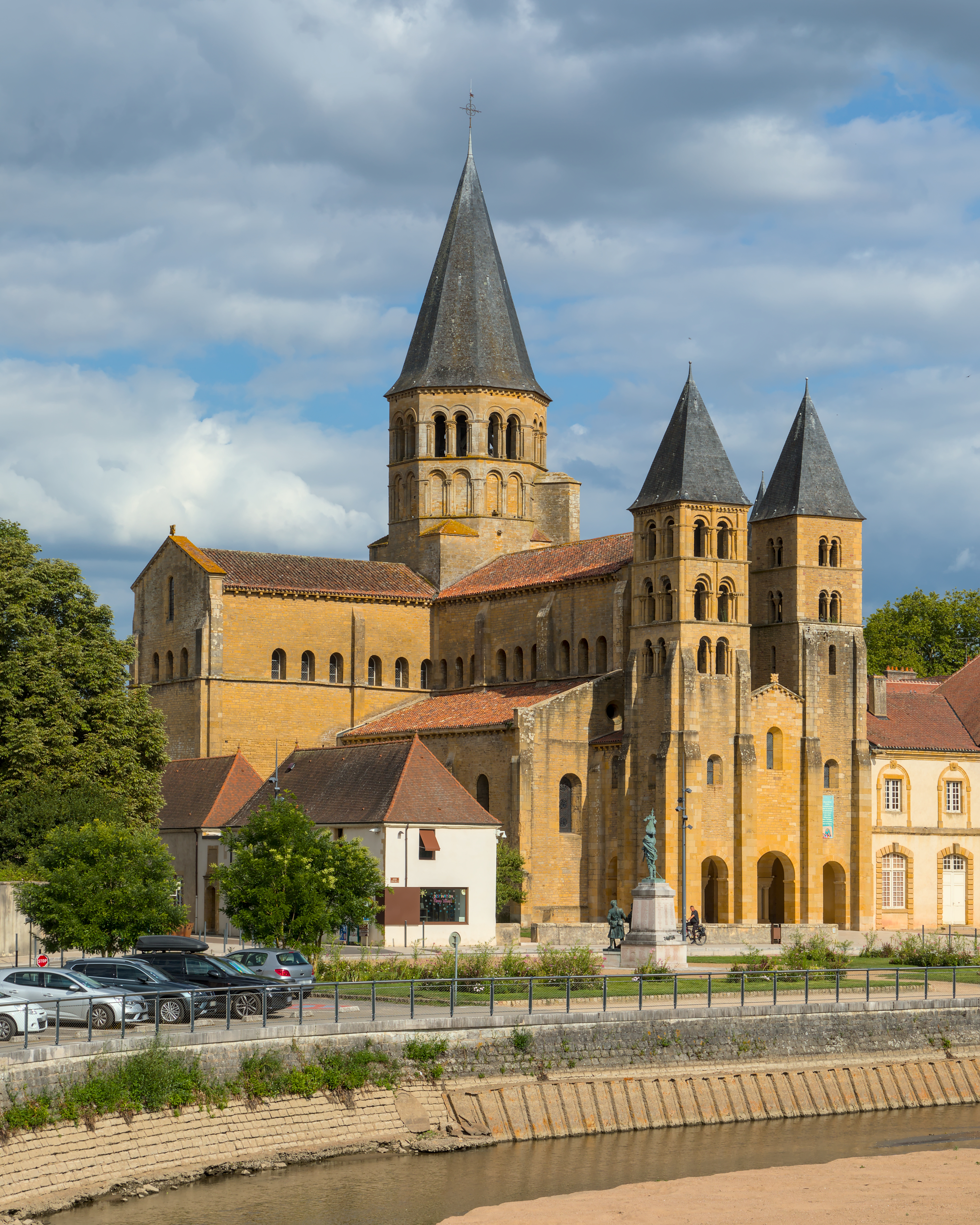
Basilica of Paray-le-Monial

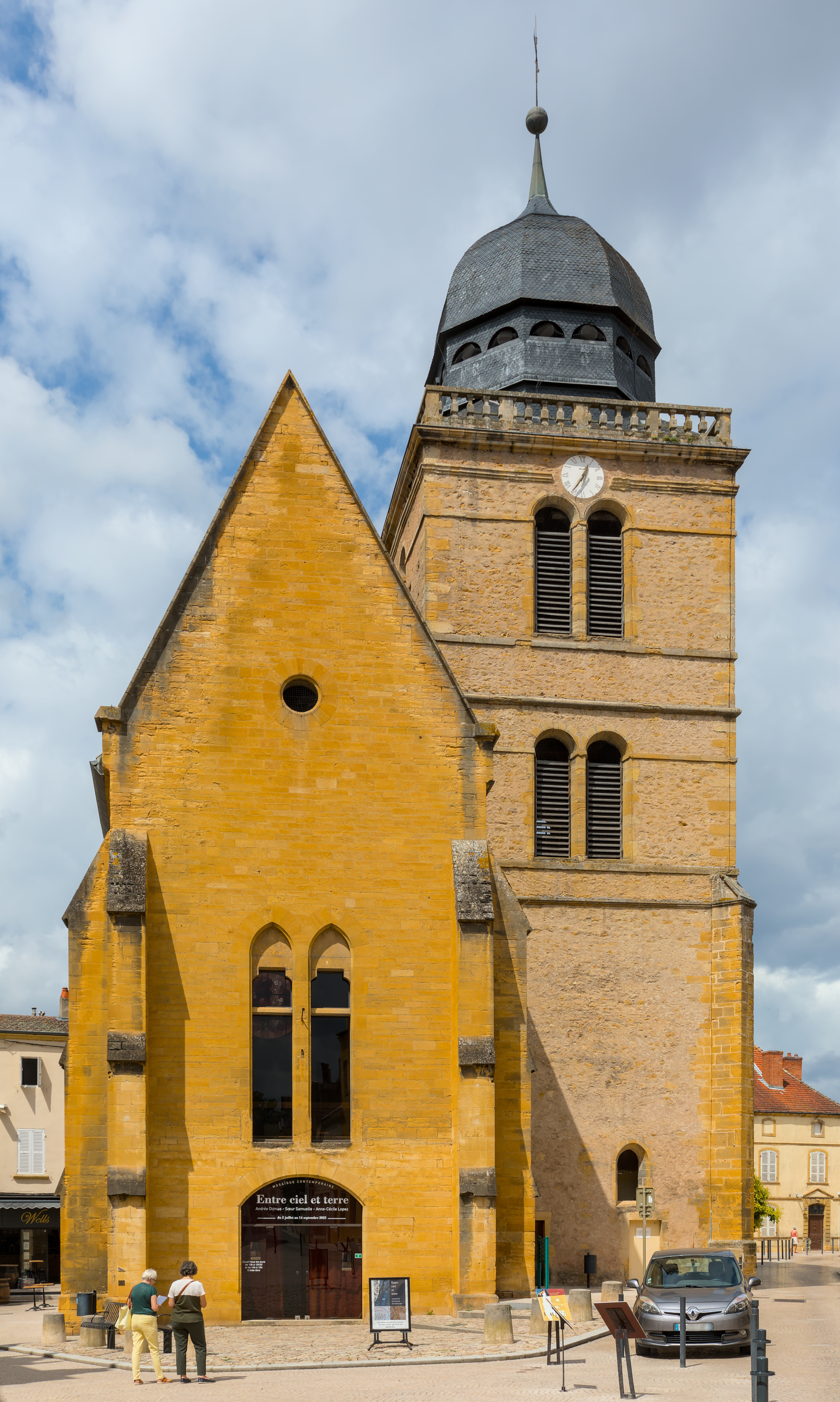
Saint Nicolas' tower

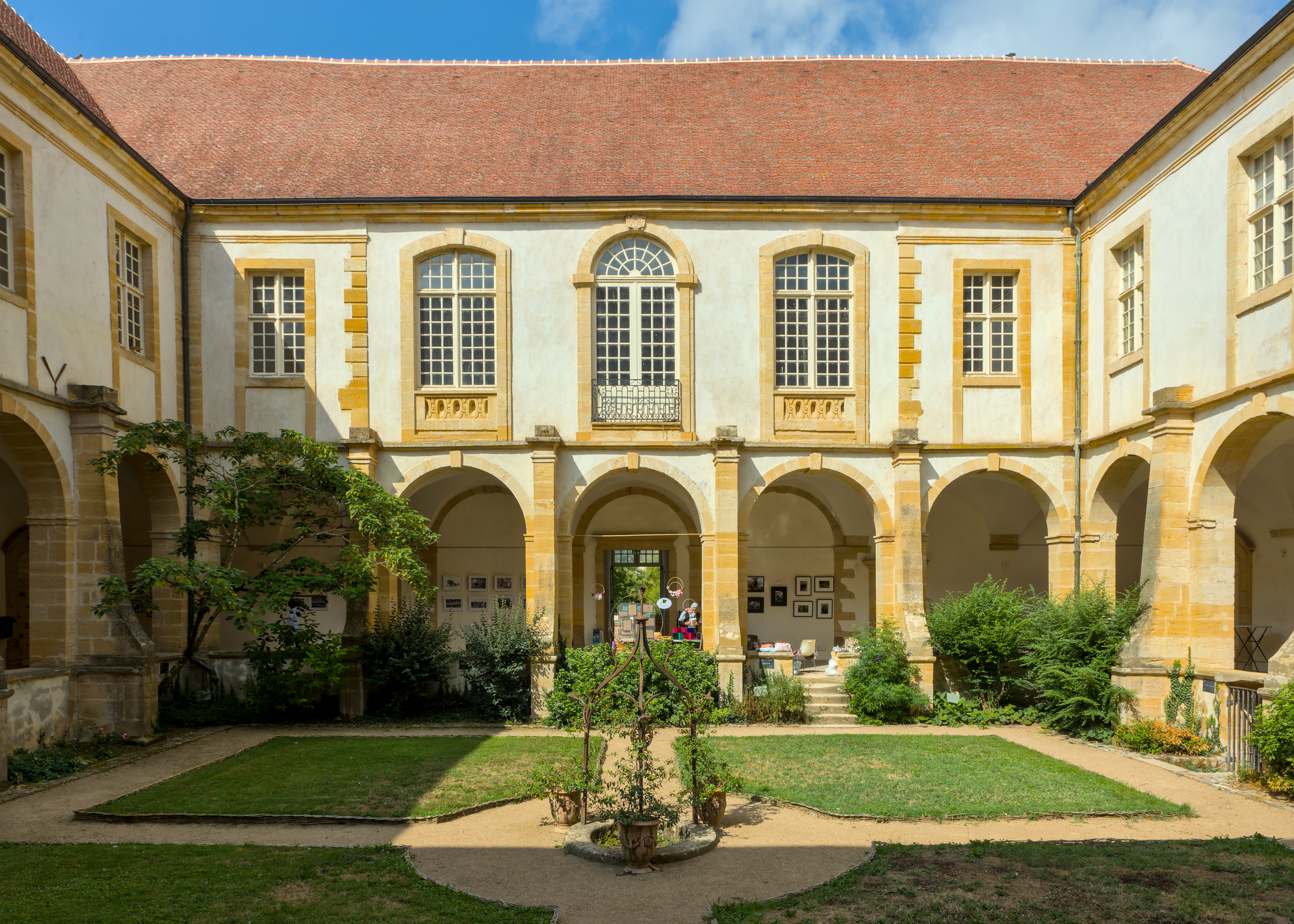
Cloister

The town is mainly known for its Romanesque church of the Sacré-Coeur ("Sacred Heart") and as a place of pilgrimage. It was built starting in the 12th century as a small-scale version of the Abbey of Cluny. It was finished in the 14th century, while the cloister dates to the 18th century.

The Hôtel de Ville, in Renaissance style, is also one of the historical monuments. Another major building in Paray-le-Monial is Saint Nicolas' tower, built during the 16th century, which hosts different exhibitions but mainly mosaic exhibitions.

== Economy ==
The area's primary industry is agriculture, in particular beef cattle farming. The area is known for its charolais cattle.

== Notable people ==
- Saint Claude de la Colombière (1641–1682), Jesuit priest and the confessor of Saint Margaret Mary Alacoque.
- Saint Margaret Mary Alacoque (1647–1690), Visitation nun and mystic who promoted devotion to the Sacred Heart of Jesus. Jesus' apparitions are recognized by the Roman Catholic Church.
- Jules Quicherat (1814–1882), historian and archaeologist.
- Léon-Benoît-Charles Thomas (1826–1894), cardinal
- Émile Buisson (1902–1956), gangster
- Jacqueline Maillan (1923–1992), actress
- Gérard Ducarouge (1941–2015), Formula One car designer
- Richard Trivino (born 1977), goalkeeper
- Vincent Clerc (born 1981), rugby union player
- Alexandre Lapandry (born 1989), rugby union player

== Twin towns - Sister cities ==
Paray-le-Monial is twinned with:

- Bethlehem, Palestine
- Bad Dürkheim, Germany
- Payerne, Switzerland
- Wells, United Kingdom

== Climate ==
Climate data for Paray-le-Monial-Saint-Yan (1991–2020 normals, extremes 1954–present)
Month	Jan	Feb	Mar	Apr	May	Jun	Jul	Aug	Sep	Oct	Nov	Dec	Year
Record high °C (°F)	18.1 (64.6)	23.2 (73.8)	25.9 (78.6)	28.8 (83.8)	33.4 (92.1)	39.7 (103.5)	41.7 (107.1)	40.2 (104.4)	35.6 (96.1)	30.6 (87.1)	23.6 (74.5)	19.8 (67.6)	41.7 (107.1)
Mean daily maximum °C (°F)	7.1 (44.8)	8.7 (47.7)	13.2 (55.8)	16.5 (61.7)	20.4 (68.7)	24.4 (75.9)	26.7 (80.1)	26.7 (80.1)	22.1 (71.8)	17.1 (62.8)	11.1 (52.0)	7.5 (45.5)	16.8 (62.2)
Daily mean °C (°F)	3.6 (38.5)	4.3 (39.7)	7.6 (45.7)	10.4 (50.7)	14.3 (57.7)	18.1 (64.6)	20.3 (68.5)	20.1 (68.2)	15.9 (60.6)	12.2 (54.0)	7.2 (45.0)	4.1 (39.4)	11.5 (52.7)
Mean daily minimum °C (°F)	0.2 (32.4)	0.0 (32.0)	2.1 (35.8)	4.4 (39.9)	8.3 (46.9)	11.9 (53.4)	13.8 (56.8)	13.5 (56.3)	9.8 (49.6)	7.2 (45.0)	3.3 (37.9)	0.8 (33.4)	6.3 (43.3)
Record low °C (°F)	−24.2 (−11.6)	−23.6 (−10.5)	−13.3 (8.1)	−8.2 (17.2)	−3.1 (26.4)	0.3 (32.5)	3.9 (39.0)	1.7 (35.1)	−2.2 (28.0)	−8.1 (17.4)	−11.3 (11.7)	−16.9 (1.6)	−24.2 (−11.6)
Average precipitation mm (inches)	51.0 (2.01)	42.5 (1.67)	49.5 (1.95)	60.7 (2.39)	82.4 (3.24)	67.5 (2.66)	71.6 (2.82)	72.1 (2.84)	68.0 (2.68)	73.5 (2.89)	76.0 (2.99)	57.6 (2.27)	772.4 (30.41)
Average precipitation days (≥ 1.0 mm)	10.1	8.8	9.0	10.1	10.9	8.5	8.4	8.2	8.6	10.6	10.8	11.3	115.2
Mean monthly sunshine hours	65.3	88.7	146.6	167.7	197.9	226.9	247.6	230.3	167.0	111.8	66.1	52.1	1,767.7
Source: Meteociel

== See also ==
- Communes of the Saône-et-Loire department

== Sources ==
- Bouchard, Constance Brittain (2015). Rewriting Saints and Ancestors: Memory and Forgetting in France, 500-1200. University of Pennsylvania Press.
- Chisholm, Hugh, ed. (1911). "Paray-le-Monial" . Encyclopædia Britannica. Vol. 20 (11th ed.). Cambridge University Press. p. 799.
- Herbermann, Charles, ed. (1913). "Paray-le-Monial" . Catholic Encyclopedia. New York: Robert Appleton Company.
