= Saône-et-Loire's 2nd constituency =

Constituency of the French Fifth Republic

2nd constituency of Saône-et-Loire
- inline Constituency of the National Assembly of France

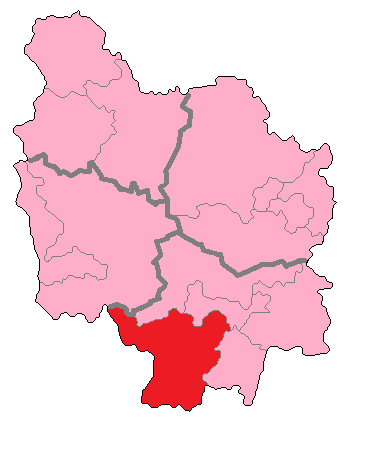
- Saône-et-Loire's 2nd Constituency shown within Burgundy
- Deputy: Josiane Corneloup; LR
- Department: Saône-et-Loire
- Cantons: Bourbon-Lancy, Charolles, Chauffailles, La Clayette, Digoin, Gueugnon, La Guiche, Marcigny, Mont-Saint-Vincent, Palinges, Paray-le-Monial, Saint-Bonnet-de-Joux, Semur-en-Brionnais, Toulon-sur-Arroux
- Registered voters: 81,295

The 2nd constituency of the Saône-et-Loire is a French legislative constituency in the Saône-et-Loire département.

== Description ==
The 2nd constituency of the Saône-et-Loire covers the southwestern portion of the department, The constituency has no major urban centre but does include the town of Marcigny, which is famous for the ceramics factory of Émile Henry Ltd.

Politically the seat has swung between left and right, between 1988 and 1997 it was held by Jean-Marc Nesme of the UDF who re-captured the seat in 2002 this time running as a UMP candidate.

== Historic Representation ==
Election	Member	Party
1958	Pierre Dufour	CNIP
1962	Paul Duraffour	PRRRS
1967	Paul Duraffour	PRRRS
1968	Paul Duraffour	PRRRS
1973	Paul Duraffour	MRG
1978	Paul Duraffour	MRG
1981	Paul Duraffour	MRG
1986	Proportional representation – no election by constituency	
1988	Jean-Marc Nesme	UDF
1993	Jean-Marc Nesme	UDF
1997	Jacques Rebillard	PRG
2002	Jean-Marc Nesme	UMP
2007	Jean-Marc Nesme	UMP
2012	Edith Gueugneau	DVG
2017	Josiane Corneloup	LR
2022	Josiane Corneloup	LR
2024	Josiane Corneloup	LR

== Election results ==
=== 2024 ===
Candidate	Party	Alliance	First round			Second round		
Candidate	Party	Alliance	Votes	%	+/–	Votes	%	+/–
Olivier Damien	RN		19,738	37.85	+19.01	21,360	41.61	new
Josiane Corneloup	LR	UDC	17,511	33.58	-3.23	29,977	58.39	-8.26
Sébastien Gautheron	PCF	NFP	9,124	17.50	-2.51			
Raymond Zekpa	RE	Ensemble	5,094	9.77	-6.47			
Patrick Berthelot	LO		677	1.30	-0.49			
Votes			52,144	100.00		51,337	100.00	
Valid votes			52,144	97.34	-0.45	51,337	95.31	+1.20
Blank votes			894	1.67	+0.14	1,816	3.37	-0.73
Null votes			532	0.99	+0.31	710	1.32	-0.48
Turnout			53,570	69.92	+19.45	53,863	70.29	+23.17
Abstentions			23,051	30.08	-19.45	22,767	29.71	-23.17
Registered voters			76,621			76,630		
Result			LR HOLD					

=== 2022 ===
Legislative Election 2022: Saône-et-Loire's 2nd constituency
Party	Candidate	Votes	%	±%
LR (UDC)	Josiane Corneloup	14,031	36.81	+12.76
PCF (NUPÉS)	Céline Vinauger	7,627	20.01	+6.88
RN	Olivier Damien	7,179	18.84	+6.80
MoDem (Ensemble)	Laurence Gauthier	6,188	16.24	−15.11
REC	Laurence Albert	1,373	3.60	N/A
Others	N/A	1,715	-	−
Turnout		38,113	50.47	+0.70
2nd round result
LR (UDC)	Josiane Corneloup	22,823	66.65	+15.61
PCF (NUPÉS)	Céline Vinauger	11,419	33.35	N/A
Turnout		34,242	47.12	+6.80
LR hold				

=== 2017 ===
Legislative Election 2017: Saône-et-Loire's 2nd constituency
Party	Candidate	Votes	%	±%
LREM	Vincent Chauvet	12,225	31.35	
LR	Josiane Corneloup	9,376	24.05	
FN	Antoine Chudzik	4,696	12.04	
PCF	Philippe Bonnot	3,886	9.97	
PRG	Dominique Lotte	3,813	9.78	
DVD	Philippe Guyot De Caila	1,533	3.93	
EELV	Dominique Cornet	1,231	3.16	
DLF	Eric Nevers	890	2.28	
Others	N/A	1,343		
Turnout		38,993	49.77	
2nd round result
LR	Josiane Corneloup	16,124	51.04	
LREM	Vincent Chauvet	15,466	48.96	
Turnout		31,590	40.32	
LR gain from DVG				

=== 2012 ===
Legislative Election 2012: Saône-et-Loire's 2nd constituency
Party	Candidate	Votes	%	±%
UMP	Jean-Marc Nesme	17,777	37.35	
DVG	Edith Gueugneau	14,004	29.42	
EELV	Nicolas Guillemet	6,996	14.70	
FN	Marie-Christiane Colas	5,779	12.14	
FG	Isabelle Voillot	2,149	4.51	
Others	N/A	892		
Turnout		47,597	58.54	
2nd round result
DVG	Edith Gueugneau	25,124	52.82	
UMP	Jean-Marc Nesme	22,443	47.18	
Turnout		47,567	58.51	
DVG gain from UMP				

=== 2007 ===
Legislative Election 2007: Saône-et-Loire's 2nd constituency
Party	Candidate	Votes	%	±%
UMP	Jean-Marc Nesme	17,157	43.38	
PRG	Jacques Rebillard	13,304	33.64	
MoDem	André Chassort	2,692	6.81	
DVG	Alain Bailly	1,924	4.86	
PCF	Hubert Louis	1,093	2.76	
FN	Nicole Pellenard	921	2.33	
Others	N/A	2,461	-	
Turnout		40,381	62.57	
2nd round result
UMP	Jean-Marc Nesme	20,262	50.09	
PRG	Jacques Rebillard	20,187	49.91	
Turnout		41,466	64.26	
UMP hold				

=== 2002 ===
Legislative Election 2002: Saône-et-Loire's 2nd constituency
Party	Candidate	Votes	%	±%
UMP	Jean-Marc Nesme	17,008	40.80	
PRG	Jacques Rebillard	15,419	36.99	
FN	Marie-Christine Bignon	4,847	11.63	
PCF	Hubert Louis	1,456	3.49	
Others	N/A	2,953	-	
Turnout		42,537	65.84	
2nd round result
UMP	Jean-Marc Nesme	19,980	50.09	
PRG	Jacques Rebillard	19,909	49.91	
Turnout		41,188	63.77	
UMP gain from PRG				

=== 1997 ===
Legislative Election 1997: Saône-et-Loire's 2nd constituency
Party	Candidate	Votes	%	±%
PPDF (UDF)	Jean-Marc Nesme	15,444	37.11	
PRG	Jacques Rebillard	12,446	29.91	
FN	Michel Aufranc	4,166	10.01	
PCF	Hubert Louis	3,690	8.87	
LDI	Christian Duclos	1,953	4.69	
LV	Maité Aymes	1,504	3.61	
DVG	Alain Bailly	1,477	3.55	
MDC	Jacques Mitaine	934	2.24	
Turnout		44,720	69.91	
2nd round result
PRG	Jacques Rebillard	22,619	51.66	
PPDF (UDF)	Jean-Marc Nesme	21,169	48.34	
Turnout		46,259	72.32	
PRG gain from PPDF				

== Sources ==
Official results of French elections from 2002: "Résultats électoraux officiels en France" (in French).
