= Dompierre-sous-Sanvignes =

- Commune
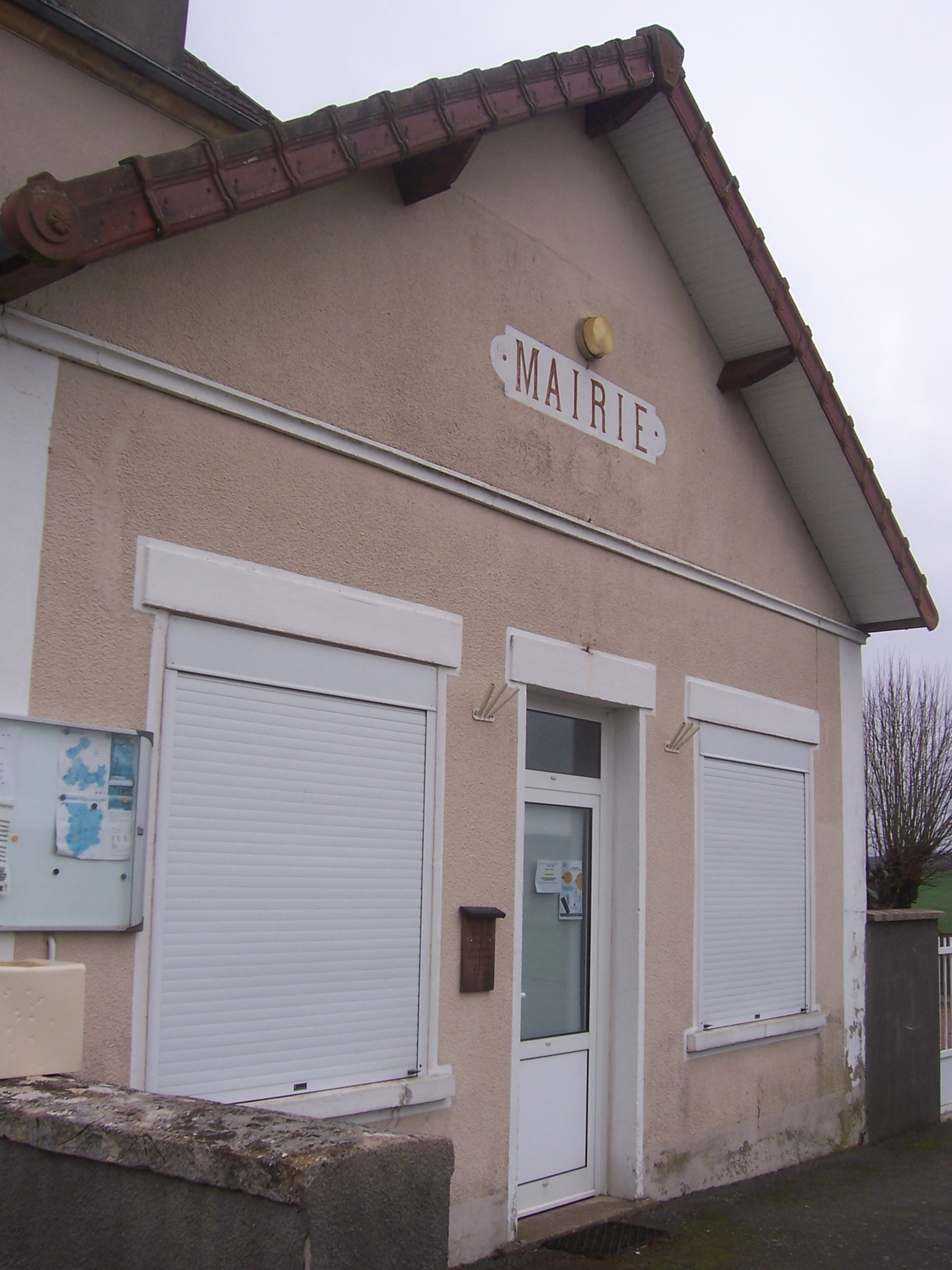
- The town hall in Dompierre-sous-Sanvignes
- Location of Dompierre-sous-Sanvignes
- Location within France Location within Bourgogne-Franche-Comté
- Coordinates: 46°39′10″N 4°13′34″E
- Country: France
- Region: Bourgogne-Franche-Comté
- Department: Saône-et-Loire
- Arrondissement: Charolles
- Canton: Gueugnon
- Area^{1}: 13.58 km^{2} (5.24 sq mi)
- Elevation: 303 m (994 ft)
- Highest elevation: 344 m (1,129 ft)
- Lowest elevation: 275 m (902 ft)
- Population (2023): 75
  - Density: 5.5/km^{2} (14/sq mi)
- Time zone: UTC+01:00 (CET)
  - Summer (DST): UTC+02:00 (CEST)
- INSEE/Postal code: 71179 /71420
- ^{1} French Land Register data, which excludes lakes, ponds, glaciers > 1 km^{2} (0.386 sq mi or 247 acres) and river estuaries.

Dompierre-sous-Sanvignes (French pronunciation: [dɔ̃pjɛʁ su sɑ̃viɲ], literally Dompierre under Sanvignes) is a commune in the Saône-et-Loire department in the region of Bourgogne-Franche-Comté in eastern France.

It is located close to Perrecy-les-Forges.

== See also ==
- Communes of the Saône-et-Loire department
