= Cantons of the Saône-et-Loire department =

The following is a list of the 29 cantons of the Saône-et-Loire department, in France, following the French canton reorganisation which came into effect in March 2015:

- Autun-1
- Autun-2
- Blanzy
- Chagny
- Chalon-sur-Saône-1
- Chalon-sur-Saône-2
- Chalon-sur-Saône-3
- La Chapelle-de-Guinchay
- Charolles
- Chauffailles
- Cluny
- Le Creusot-1
- Le Creusot-2
- Cuiseaux
- Digoin
- Gergy
- Givry
- Gueugnon
- Hurigny
- Louhans
- Mâcon-1
- Mâcon-2
- Montceau-les-Mines
- Ouroux-sur-Saône
- Paray-le-Monial
- Pierre-de-Bresse
- Saint-Rémy
- Saint-Vallier
- Tournus
