= Saint-Berain-sous-Sanvignes =

- Commune
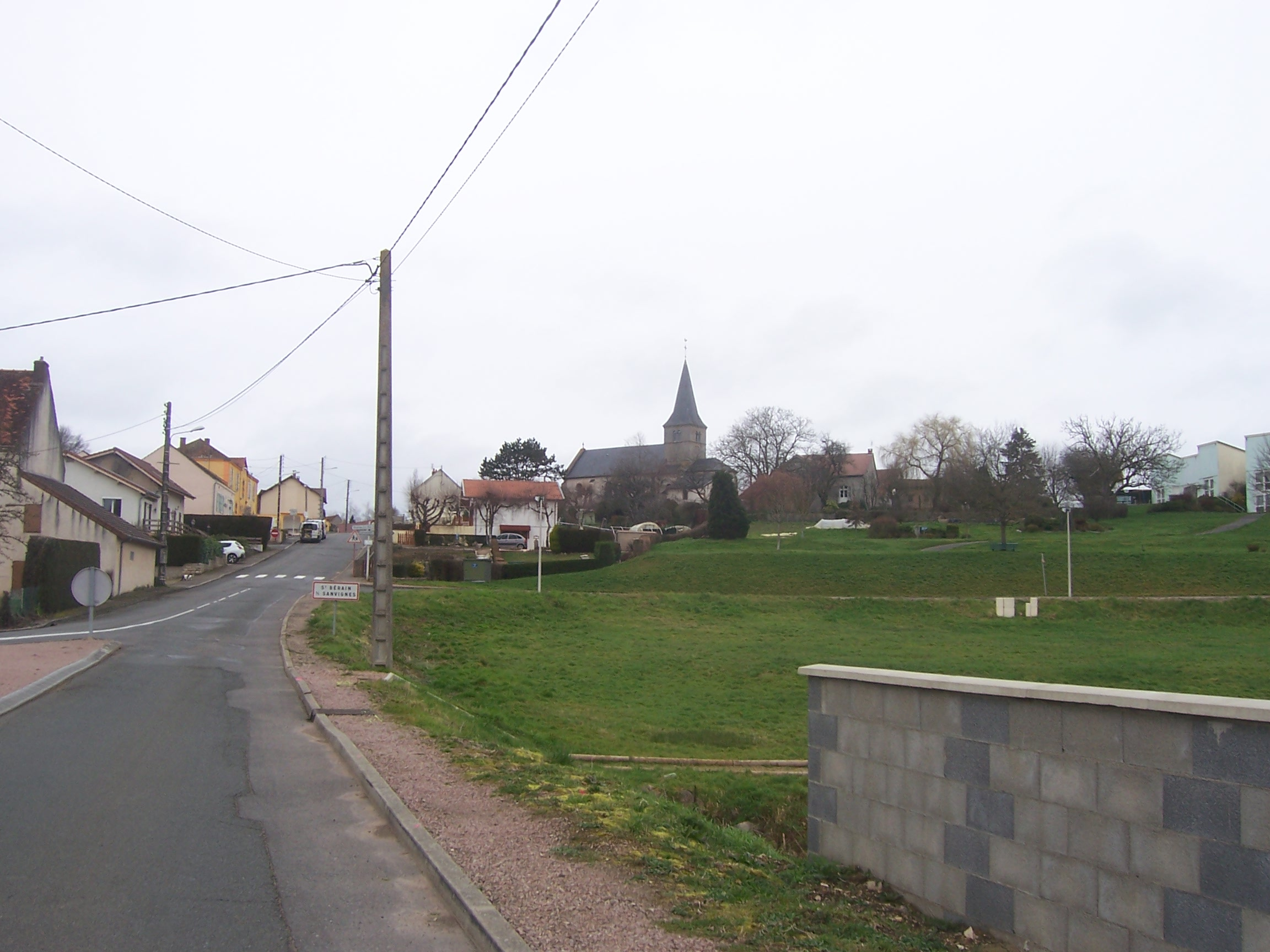
- A general view of Saint-Berain-sous-Sanvignes
- Location of Saint-Berain-sous-Sanvignes
- Location within France Location within Bourgogne-Franche-Comté
- Coordinates: 46°42′27″N 4°17′46″E
- Country: France
- Region: Bourgogne-Franche-Comté
- Department: Saône-et-Loire
- Arrondissement: Autun
- Canton: Montceau-les-Mines
- Intercommunality: CU Creusot Montceau

Government
  - Mayor (2020–2026): Noël Valette
- Area^{1}: 45.07 km^{2} (17.40 sq mi)
- Elevation: 389 m (1,276 ft)
- Highest elevation: 425 m (1,394 ft)
- Lowest elevation: 288 m (945 ft)
- Population (2023): 1,102
  - Density: 24.45/km^{2} (63.33/sq mi)
- Time zone: UTC+01:00 (CET)
  - Summer (DST): UTC+02:00 (CEST)
- INSEE/Postal code: 71390 /71300
- ^{1} French Land Register data, which excludes lakes, ponds, glaciers > 1 km^{2} (0.386 sq mi or 247 acres) and river estuaries.

Saint-Berain-sous-Sanvignes (French pronunciation: [sɛ̃ beʁɛn su sɑ̃viɲ], lit. 'Saint-Berain under Sanvignes') is a commune in the Saône-et-Loire department in the region of Bourgogne-Franche-Comté in eastern France.

== See also ==
- Communes of the Saône-et-Loire department
