= Génelard =

- Commune
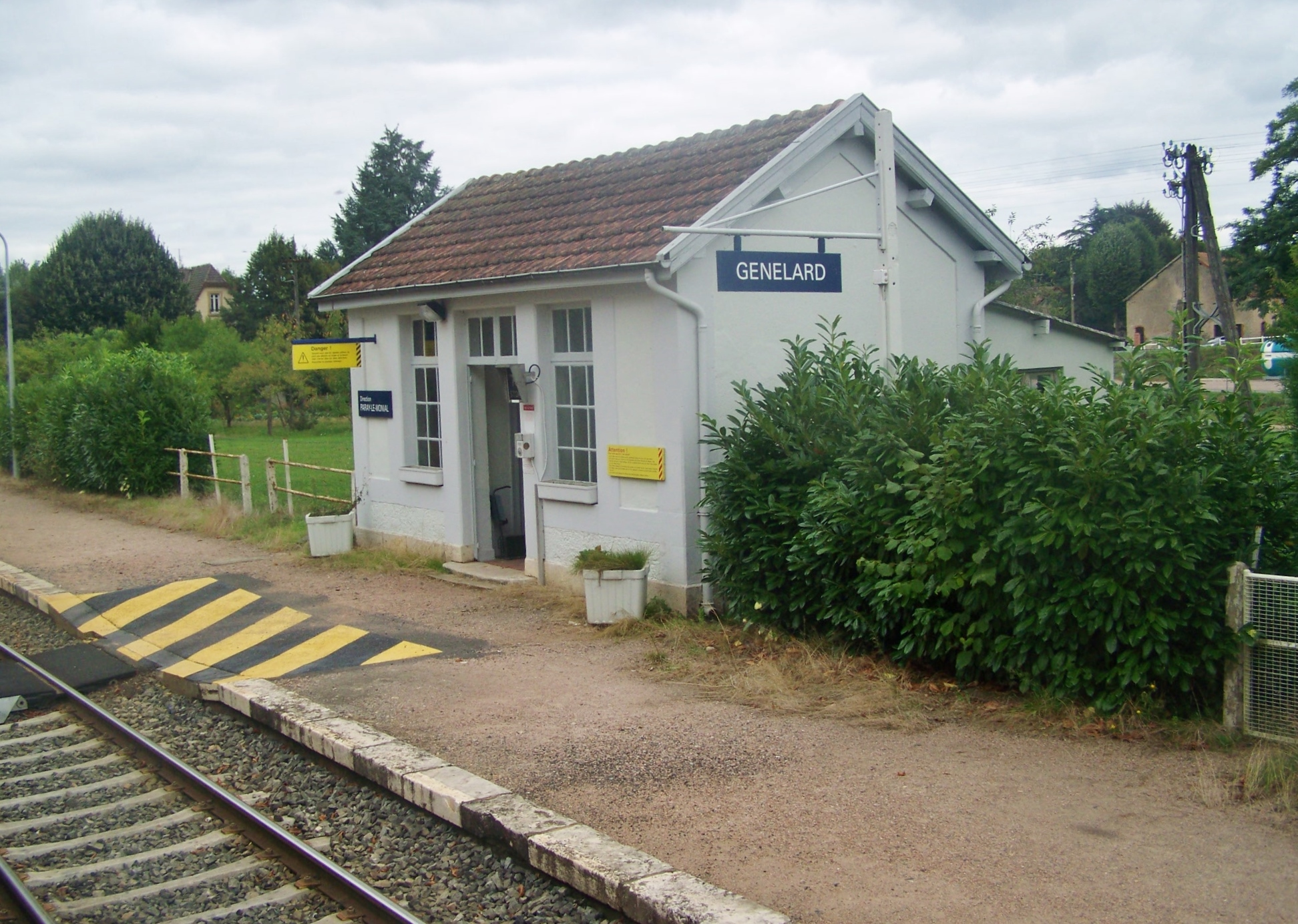
- Train station
- Location of Génelard
- Location within France Location within Bourgogne-Franche-Comté
- Coordinates: 46°34′57″N 4°14′16″E
- Country: France
- Region: Bourgogne-Franche-Comté
- Department: Saône-et-Loire
- Arrondissement: Autun
- Canton: Saint-Vallier
- Intercommunality: CU Creusot Montceau

Government
  - Mayor (2020–2026): Jean-François Jaunet
- Area^{1}: 22.13 km^{2} (8.54 sq mi)
- Elevation: 234 m (768 ft)
- Highest elevation: 345 m (1,132 ft)
- Lowest elevation: 257 m (843 ft)
- Population (2023): 1,394
  - Density: 62.99/km^{2} (163.1/sq mi)
- Time zone: UTC+01:00 (CET)
  - Summer (DST): UTC+02:00 (CEST)
- INSEE/Postal code: 71212 /71420
- ^{1} French Land Register data, which excludes lakes, ponds, glaciers > 1 km^{2} (0.386 sq mi or 247 acres) and river estuaries.

Génelard (French pronunciation: [ʒenlaʁ]) is a commune in the Saône-et-Loire department in the region of Bourgogne-Franche-Comté in eastern France.

== Geography ==
The Bourbince flows southwest through the middle of the commune and crosses the village.

== See also ==
- Communes of the Saône-et-Loire department
