= Canton of Saint-Vallier =

Canton of Saint-Vallier may refer to 2 administrative divisions in France:

- Canton of Saint-Vallier, Drôme, in Drôme department, Auvergne-Rhône-Alpes
- Canton of Saint-Vallier, Saône-et-Loire, in Saône-et-Loire department, Bourgogne-Franche-Comté
