= Saint-Vallier, Saône-et-Loire =

Saint-Vallier
- Commune
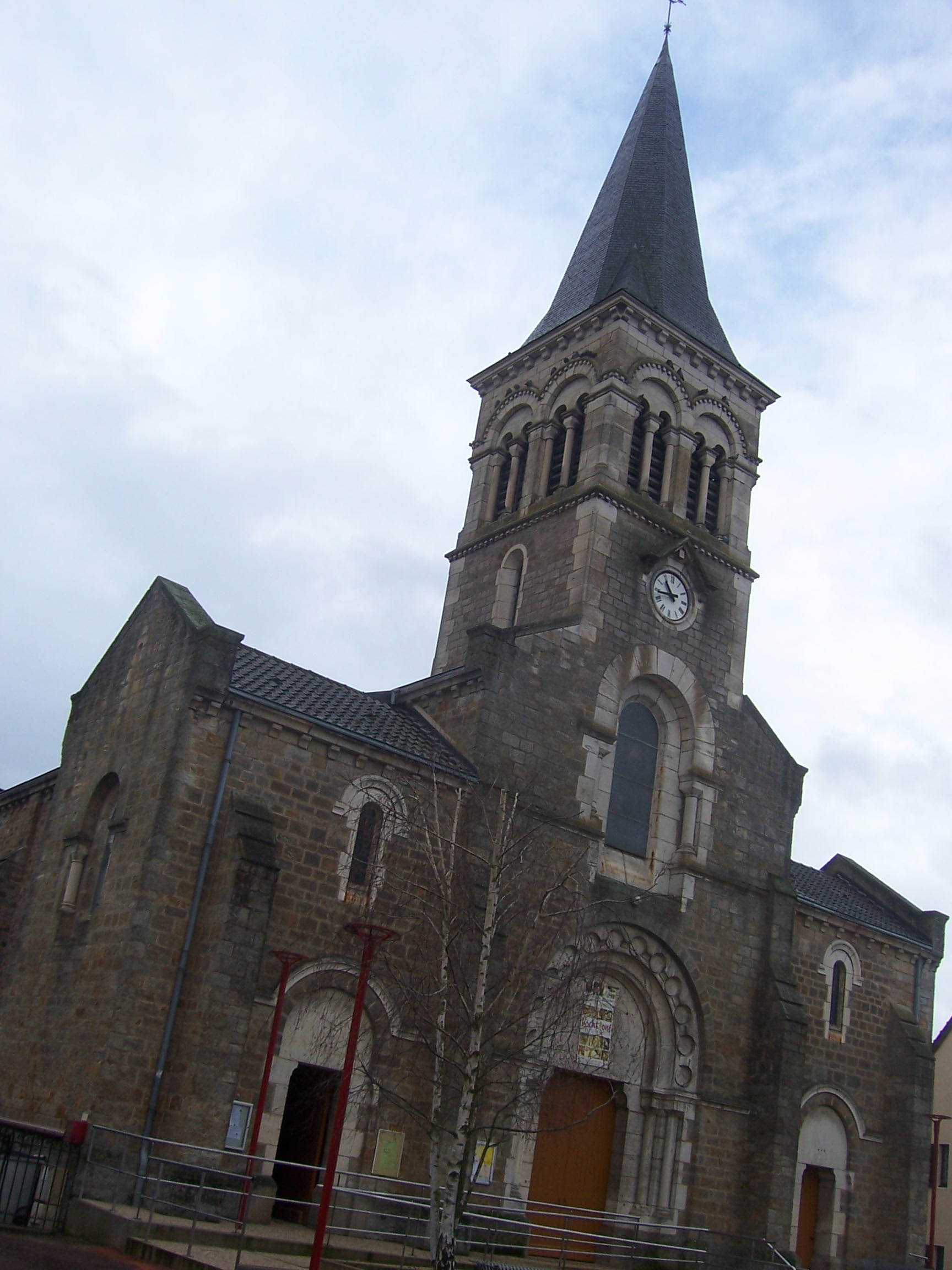
- The church in Saint-Vallier

- Coat of arms
- Location of Saint-Vallier
- Location within France Location within Bourgogne-Franche-Comté
- Coordinates: 46°38′34″N 4°22′19″E
- Country: France
- Region: Bourgogne-Franche-Comté
- Department: Saône-et-Loire
- Arrondissement: Autun
- Canton: Saint-Vallier
- Intercommunality: CU Creusot Montceau

Government
  - Mayor (2020–2026): Alain Philibert
- Area^{1}: 24.21 km^{2} (9.35 sq mi)
- Elevation: 323 m (1,060 ft)
- Highest elevation: 382 m (1,253 ft)
- Lowest elevation: 268 m (879 ft)
- Population (2023): 8,508
  - Density: 351.4/km^{2} (910.2/sq mi)
- Time zone: UTC+01:00 (CET)
  - Summer (DST): UTC+02:00 (CEST)
- INSEE/Postal code: 71486 /71230
- ^{1} French Land Register data, which excludes lakes, ponds, glaciers > 1 km^{2} (0.386 sq mi or 247 acres) and river estuaries.

Saint-Vallier (French pronunciation: [sɛ̃ valje]) is a commune in the Saône-et-Loire department in the region of Bourgogne-Franche-Comté in eastern France.

== Geography ==
The Bourbince flows south through the western part of the commune.

== Population ==
Historical population
Year	Pop.	±% p.a.
1968	10,370	—
1975	10,259	−0.15%
1982	10,147	−0.16%
1990	9,977	−0.21%
1999	9,541	−0.50%
2007	9,100	−0.59%
2012	8,900	−0.44%
2017	8,654	−0.56%
2023	8,508	−0.28%
Source: INSEE

== Personalities ==
- Habib Baldé, footballer
- Karim Robin, professional footballer
- Guillaume Warmuz, footballer

== See also ==
- Communes of the Saône-et-Loire department
