= Ciry-le-Noble =

- Commune
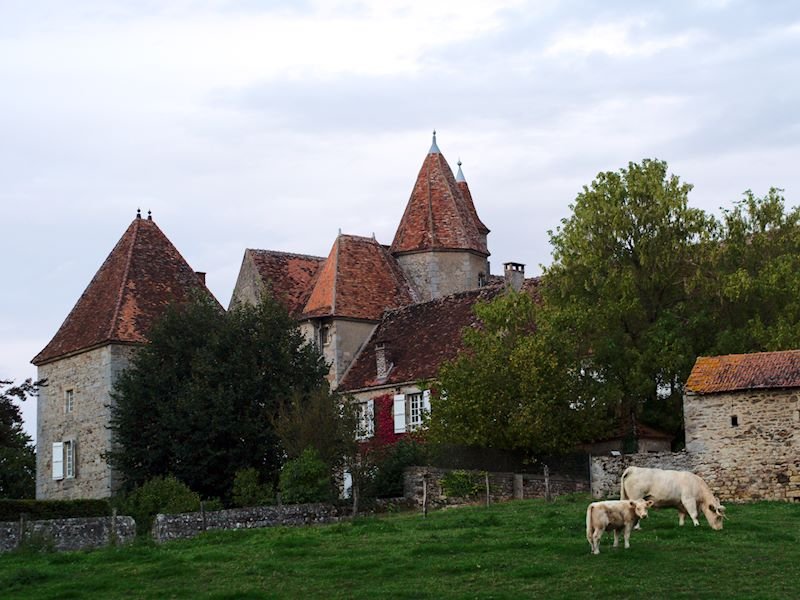
- Chateau of Sauvement
- Location of Ciry-le-Noble
- Location within France Location within Bourgogne-Franche-Comté
- Coordinates: 46°36′21″N 4°18′04″E
- Country: France
- Region: Bourgogne-Franche-Comté
- Department: Saône-et-Loire
- Arrondissement: Autun
- Canton: Saint-Vallier
- Intercommunality: CU Creusot Montceau
- Area^{1}: 33.07 km^{2} (12.77 sq mi)
- Elevation: 270 m (890 ft)
- Highest elevation: 422 m (1,385 ft)
- Lowest elevation: 262 m (860 ft)
- Population (2023): 2,177
  - Density: 65.83/km^{2} (170.5/sq mi)
- Time zone: UTC+01:00 (CET)
  - Summer (DST): UTC+02:00 (CEST)
- INSEE/Postal code: 71132 /71420
- ^{1} French Land Register data, which excludes lakes, ponds, glaciers > 1 km^{2} (0.386 sq mi or 247 acres) and river estuaries.

Ciry-le-Noble (French pronunciation: [siʁi lə nɔbl]) is a commune in the Saône-et-Loire department in the region of Bourgogne-Franche-Comté in eastern France. In the commune are located Chateau of Sauvement and Chateau of Limand.

== Geography ==
The Bourbince flows southwest through the middle of the commune and crosses the village.

== Population ==
Historical population
Year	Pop.	±% p.a.
1968	3,166	—
1975	2,994	−0.79%
1982	2,915	−0.38%
1990	2,795	−0.52%
1999	2,475	−1.34%
2007	2,411	−0.33%
2012	2,348	−0.53%
2017	2,275	−0.63%
2023	2,177	−0.73%
Source: INSEE

== See also ==
- Communes of the Saône-et-Loire department
