= Habib Baldé =

Footballer (born 1985)

Personal information
- Full name: Habib-Jean Baldé
- Date of birth: 8 February 1985 (age 41)
- Place of birth: Saint-Vallier, Saône-et-Loire, France
- Height: 1.82 m (6 ft 0 in)
- Position: Defender

Youth career
- 2003–2004: Gueugnon

Senior career*
Years	Team	Apps	(Gls)
2004–2005	Gueugnon	21	(0)
2005–2009	Reims	101	(2)
2009–2010	Ivry	7	(0)
2010	Ceahlăul	14	(0)
2010–2011	Universitatea Cluj	20	(1)
2012–2013	Nîmes	20	(2)
2013	Universitatea Cluj	9	(0)
Total		192	(5)

International career
2007–2013	Guinea	21	(1)
- * Club domestic league appearances and goals

Habib-Jean Baldé (born 8 February 1985 in Saint-Vallier, Saône-et-Loire) is a former professional footballer who played as a defender. He spent all of his career in France and Romania. A dual French-Guinean national, represented the Guinea national team at international level between 2007 and 2013, making 21 FIFA-official appearances and scoring 1 goal.
