= Arrondissements of the Saône-et-Loire department =

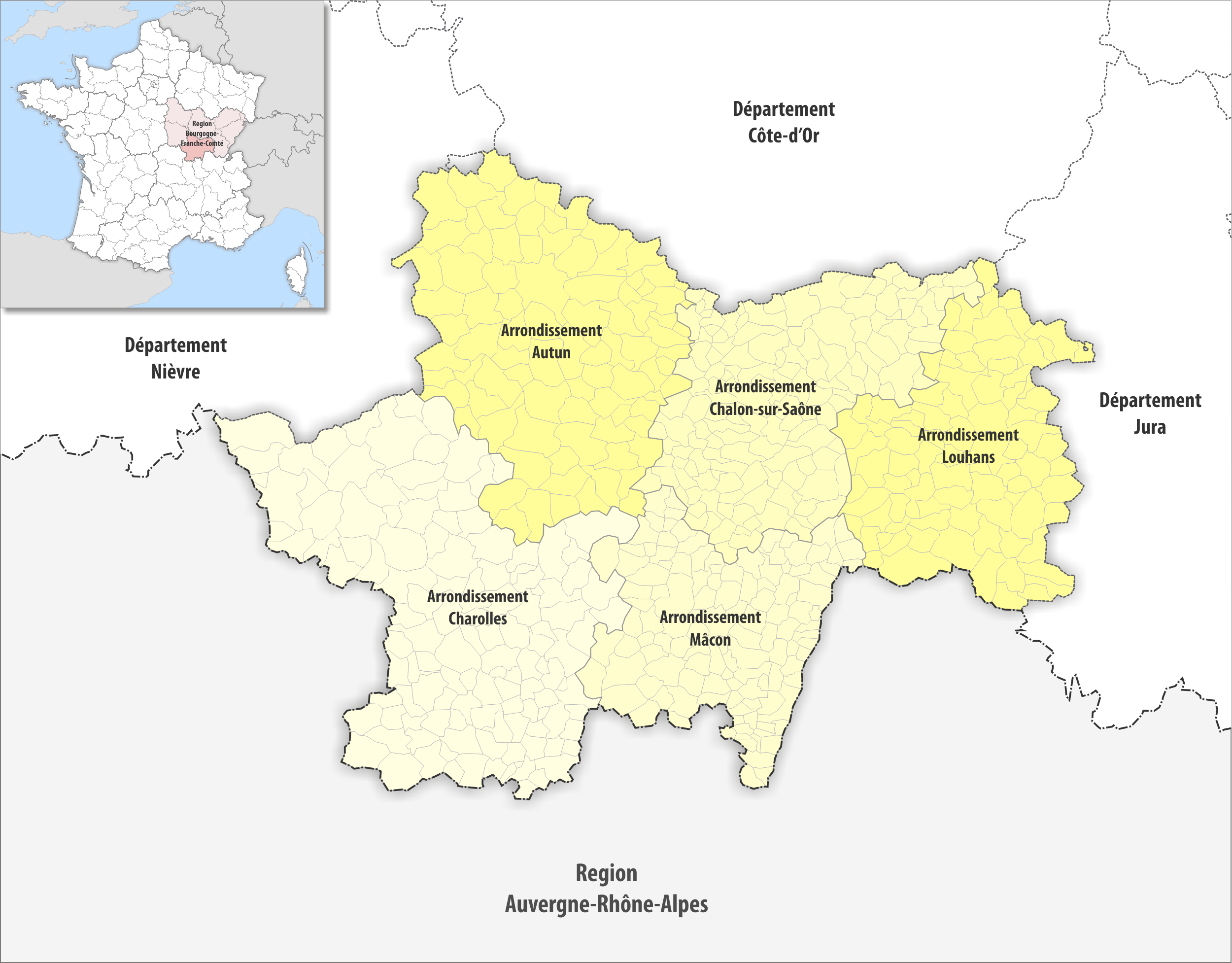
Map of arrondissements of the Saône-et-Loire department.

The 5 arrondissements of the Saône-et-Loire department are:

1. Arrondissement of Autun, (subprefecture: Autun) with 89 communes. The population of the arrondissement was 125,896 in 2021.
2. Arrondissement of Chalon-sur-Saône, (subprefecture: Chalon-sur-Saône) with 142 communes. The population of the arrondissement was 155,905 in 2021.
3. Arrondissement of Charolles, (subprefecture: Charolles) with 126 communes. The population of the arrondissement was 85,124 in 2021.
4. Arrondissement of Louhans, (subprefecture: Louhans-Châteaurenaud) with 88 communes. The population of the arrondissement was 67,238 in 2021.
5. Arrondissement of Mâcon, (prefecture of the Saône-et-Loire department: Mâcon) with 119 communes. The population of the arrondissement was 115,125 in 2021.

== History ==
In 1800 the arrondissements of Mâcon, Autun, Chalon-sur-Saône, Charolles and Louhans were established. The arrondissement of Louhans was disbanded in 1926, and restored in 1942.

The borders of the arrondissements of Saône-et-Loire were modified in January 2017:

- six communes from the arrondissement of Autun to the arrondissement of Chalon-sur-Saône
- seven commune from the arrondissement of Autun to the arrondissement of Charolles
- 14 communes from the arrondissement of Chalon-sur-Saône to the arrondissement of Autun
- seven communes from the arrondissement of Chalon-sur-Saône to the arrondissement of Louhans
- one commune from the arrondissement of Chalon-sur-Saône to the arrondissement of Mâcon
- five communes from the arrondissement of Charolles to the arrondissement of Autun
- one commune from the arrondissement of Charolles to the arrondissement of Chalon-sur-Saône
- 10 communes from the arrondissement of Charolles to the arrondissement of Mâcon
- eight communes from the arrondissement of Mâcon to the arrondissement of Chalon-sur-Saône
- two communes from the arrondissement of Mâcon to the arrondissement of Louhans
