= Karim Robin =

French footballer (born 1984)

Personal information
- Full name: Karim Robin
- Date of birth: April 28, 1984 (age 42)
- Place of birth: Saint-Vallier, France
- Height: 1.70 m (5 ft 7 in)
- Position: Midfielder

Team information
- Current team: Gap FC

Senior career*
Years	Team	Apps	(Gls)
2002–2005	ASOA Valence	32	(1)
2006–2007	FC Rhône Vallées	?	(?)
2007–2009	Chambéry	?	(?)
2009–	Gap FC	18	(0)
- * Club domestic league appearances and goals as of 18:58, 14 June 2010 (UTC)

Karim Robin (born April 28, 1984) is a French professional footballer. He currently plays in the Championnat de France amateur for Gap FC.

Robin played at the professional level in Ligue 2 for ASOA Valence.
