= Josiane Corneloup =

French politician (born 1959)

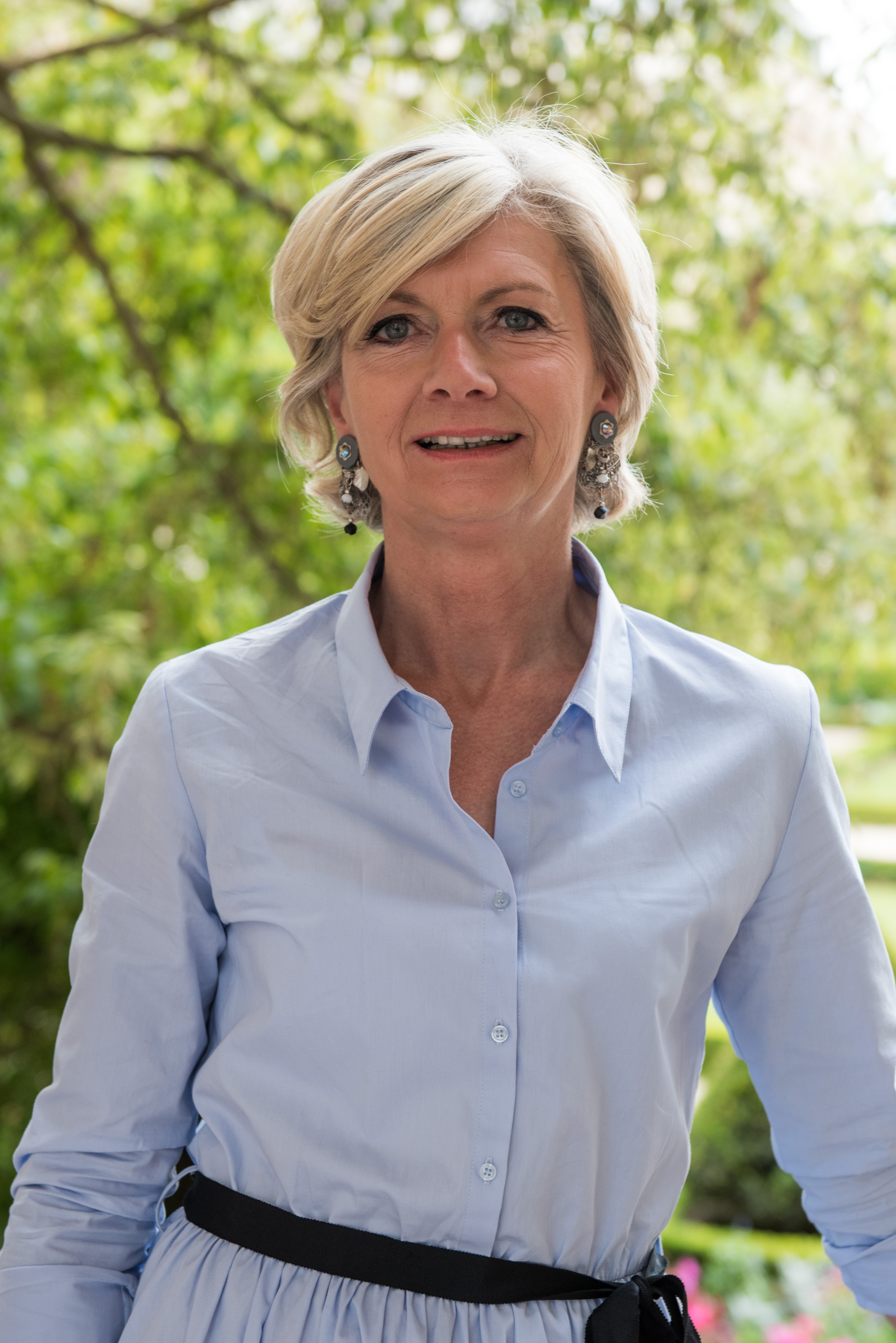

Member of the National Assembly for Saône-et-Loire's 2nd constituency
- Incumbent
- Assumed office 21 June 2017
- Preceded by: Édith Gueugneau

Mayor of Saint-Bonnet-de-Joux
- In office 30 March 2014 – 10 July 2017
- Preceded by: Jacques Lecoq
- Succeeded by: Patrick Pagès

Personal details
- Born: 30 September 1959 (age 66) Le Creusot, France
- Party: The Republicans (2016–present)
- Education: University of Auvergne
- Profession: Pharmacist

Josiane Corneloup (French pronunciation: [ʒozjan kɔʁnəlu]; born 30 September 1959) is a French pharmacist and politician of The Republicans (LR) who has represented the 2nd constituency of the Saône-et-Loire department in the National Assembly since the 2017 legislative election.

== Political career ==
Corneloup was elected to the French Parliament in the 2017 legislative election.

In parliament, Corneloup serves on the Committee on Social Affairs. In this capacity, she is the parliament's rapporteur on the government's decision to declare a state of emergency amid the COVID-19 pandemic in France in 2020.

In addition to her committee assignments, Corneloup is part of the French-Senegalese Parliamentary Friendship Group.

According to Le Monde, Corneloup was one of the wealthiest members of parliament at the time of her election.

== Political positions ==
In July 2019, Corneloup voted against the French ratification of the European Union’s Comprehensive Economic and Trade Agreement (CETA) with Canada.

Ahead of the 2022 presidential elections, Corneloup publicly declared her support for Michel Barnier as the Republicans’ candidate. In the run-up to the Republicans’ 2022 convention, he endorsed Éric Ciotti as the party's chairman.

Following the dissolution of the National Assembly on June 9, 2024, she was re-elected.
