= Canton of Montceau-les-Mines =

Coordinates: 46.67°N 4.36°E

The canton of Montceau-les-Mines is an administrative division of the Saône-et-Loire department, eastern France. It was created at the French canton reorganisation which came into effect in March 2015. Its seat is in Montceau-les-Mines.

It consists of the following communes:

1. Montceau-les-Mines
2. Saint-Berain-sous-Sanvignes
