= Perrecy-les-Forges =

- Commune
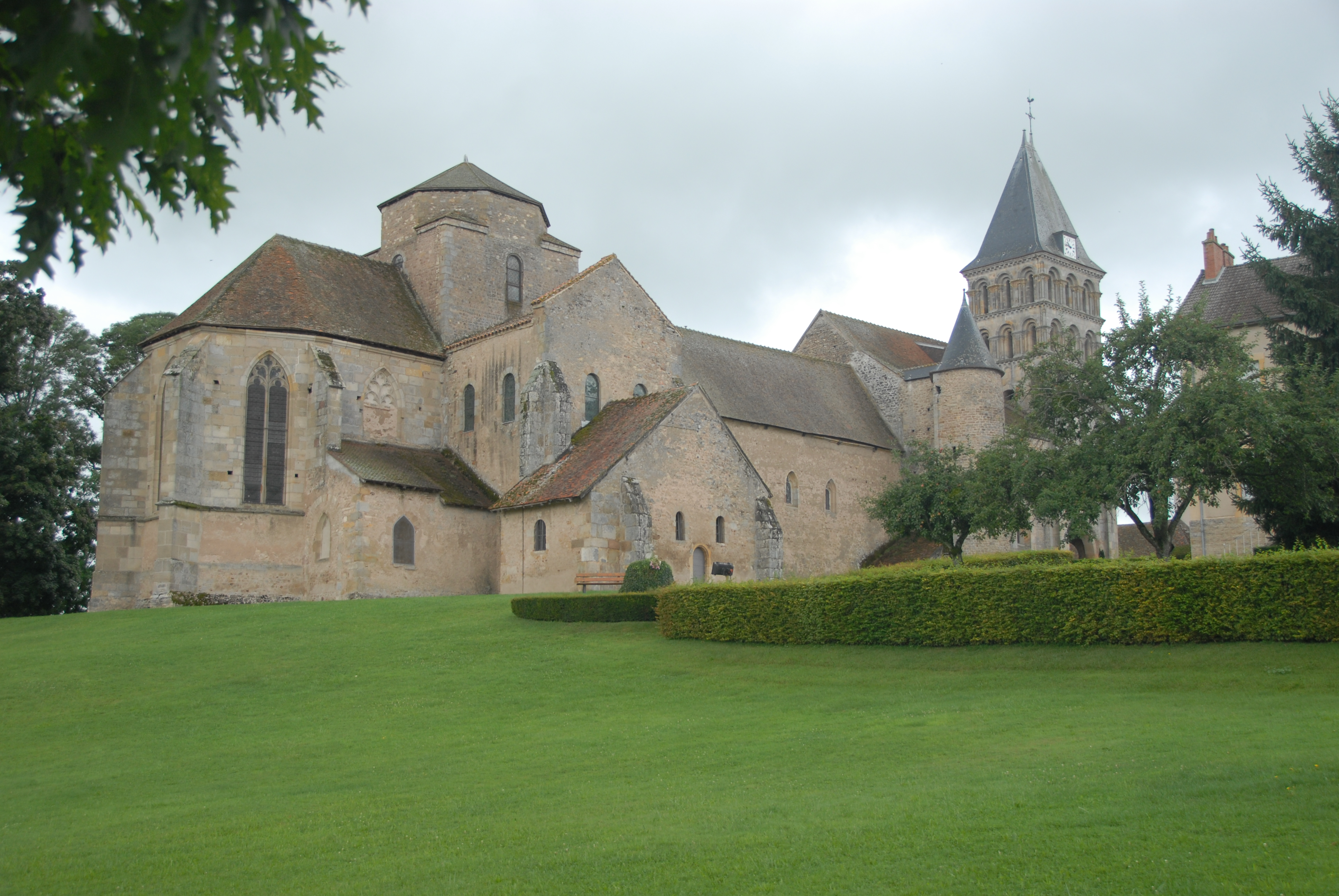
- Saint-Pierre and Saint-Benoît church
- Location of Perrecy-les-Forges
- Location within France Location within Bourgogne-Franche-Comté
- Coordinates: 46°36′56″N 4°12′56″E
- Country: France
- Region: Bourgogne-Franche-Comté
- Department: Saône-et-Loire
- Arrondissement: Autun
- Canton: Saint-Vallier
- Intercommunality: CU Creusot Montceau

Government
  - Mayor (2020–2026): Roland Barnet
- Area^{1}: 33.82 km^{2} (13.06 sq mi)
- Elevation: 308 m (1,010 ft)
- Highest elevation: 353 m (1,158 ft)
- Lowest elevation: 264 m (866 ft)
- Population (2023): 1,542
  - Density: 45.59/km^{2} (118.1/sq mi)
- Time zone: UTC+01:00 (CET)
  - Summer (DST): UTC+02:00 (CEST)
- INSEE/Postal code: 71346 /71420
- ^{1} French Land Register data, which excludes lakes, ponds, glaciers > 1 km^{2} (0.386 sq mi or 247 acres) and river estuaries.

Perrecy-les-Forges is a commune in the Saône-et-Loire department in the region of Bourgogne-Franche-Comté in eastern France. It played a significant regional influence in the 14th-16th centuries.

The name of the commune indicates that the metallurgic industry has played a role in its economy. A forge from the 17th century, and former coal mines are among the places of interest of the commune.

The church of Perrecy-les-Forges, built during the 12th century, is listed as a Monument historique since 1862 by the French Ministry of Culture.

== See also ==
- Communes of the Saône-et-Loire department
