= Jean-Marc Nesme =

French politician

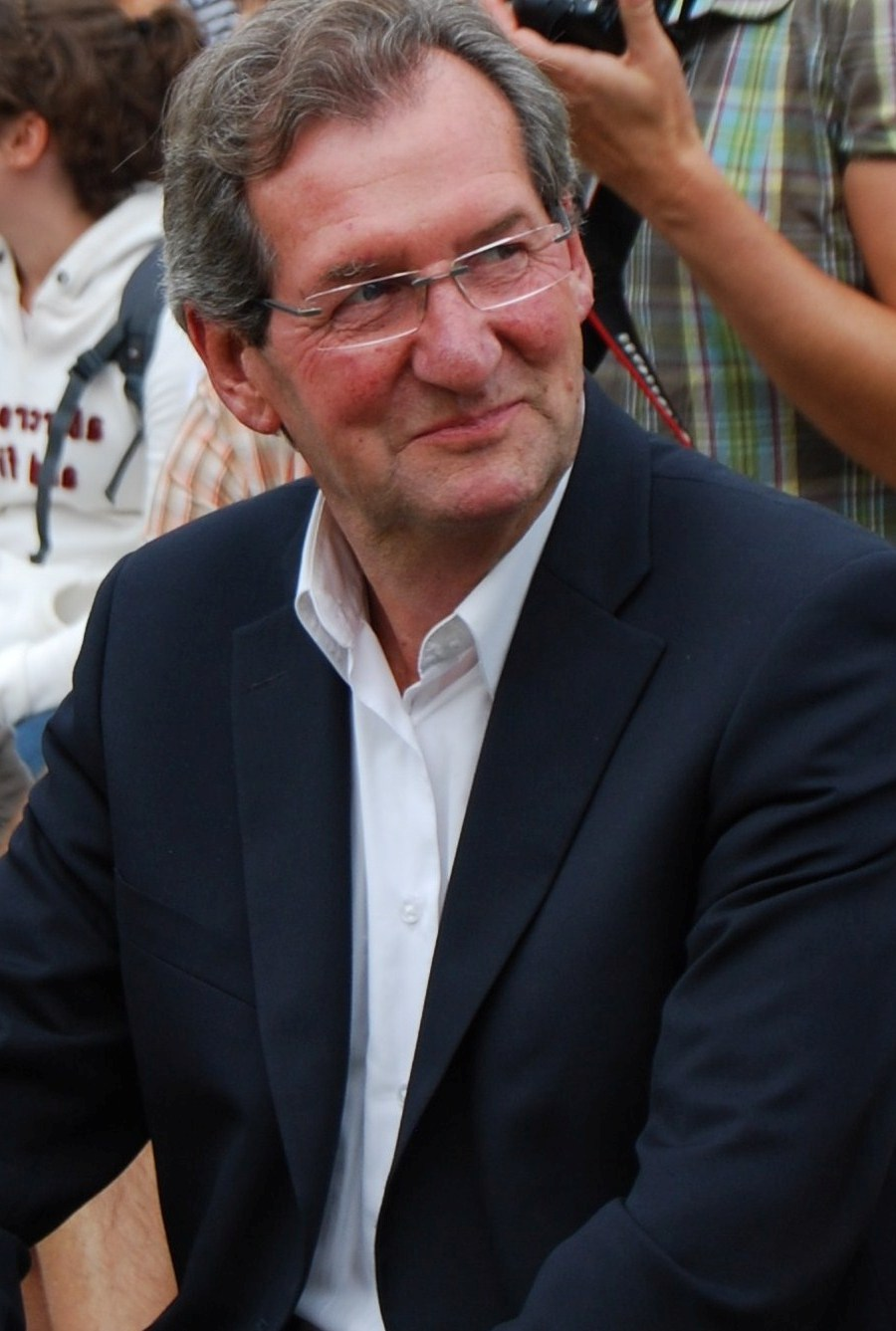
Image of Jean-Marc Nesme

Jean-Marc Nesme (born 23 March 1943) is a member of the National Assembly of France. He represents the Saône-et-Loire department, and is a member of the Union for a Popular Movement.
