= Marcigny =

- Commune
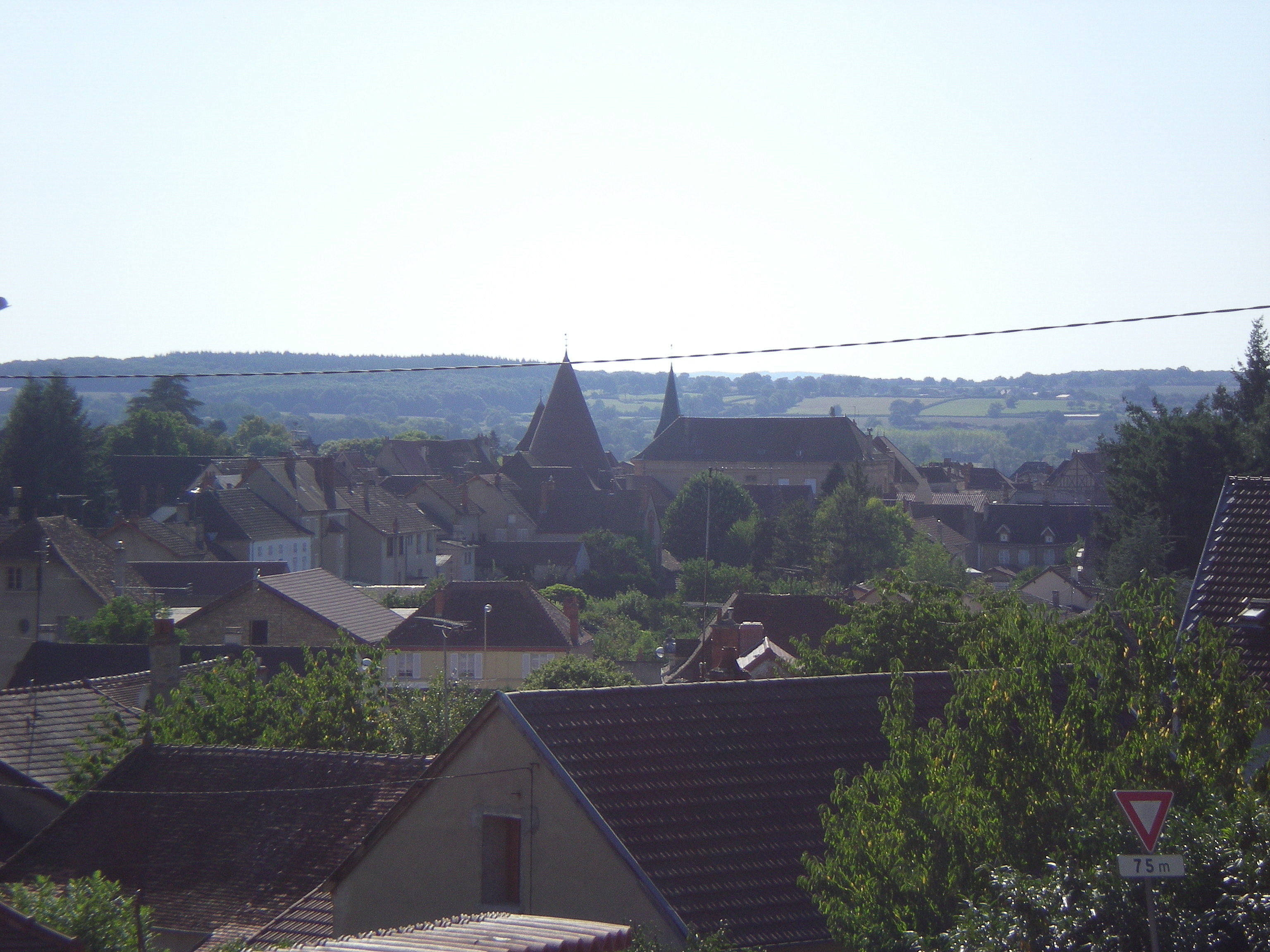
- A general view of Marcigny

- Coat of arms
- Location of Marcigny
- Location within France Location within Bourgogne-Franche-Comté
- Coordinates: 46°16′32″N 4°02′32″E
- Country: France
- Region: Bourgogne-Franche-Comté
- Department: Saône-et-Loire
- Arrondissement: Charolles
- Canton: Paray-le-Monial

Government
  - Mayor (2020–2026): Carole Chenuet Gaillard
- Area^{1}: 8.15 km^{2} (3.15 sq mi)
- Elevation: 242 m (794 ft)
- Highest elevation: 338 m (1,109 ft)
- Lowest elevation: 237 m (778 ft)
- Population (2023): 1,682
  - Density: 206/km^{2} (535/sq mi)
- Time zone: UTC+01:00 (CET)
  - Summer (DST): UTC+02:00 (CEST)
- INSEE/Postal code: 71275 /71110
- ^{1} French Land Register data, which excludes lakes, ponds, glaciers > 1 km^{2} (0.386 sq mi or 247 acres) and river estuaries.

Marcigny (French pronunciation: [maʁsiɲi]) is a commune in the Saône-et-Loire department in the region of Bourgogne-Franche-Comté in eastern France.

== History ==
Marcigny was the site of the first Cluniac monastery of women, founded in 1056. St Anselm was unsuccessful in attempting to recruit his sister Richeza to enter there after the death of her husband amid the First Crusade. Adela of Normandy, Countess of Blois, mother of King Stephen of England, took religious vows as a nun of this monastery after retiring from public life and died here in 1137.

== Economy ==
The major manufacturer of the city is Emile Henry (ceramic).

== See also ==
- Communes of the Saône-et-Loire department
