= Canton of Saint-Vallier, Saône-et-Loire =

Coordinates: 46.64°N 4.37°E

The canton of Saint-Vallier is an administrative division of the Saône-et-Loire department, eastern France. It was created at the French canton reorganisation which came into effect in March 2015. Its seat is in Saint-Vallier.

It consists of the following communes:

1. Ciry-le-Noble
2. Génelard
3. Perrecy-les-Forges
4. Saint-Vallier
5. Sanvignes-les-Mines
