= Montceau-les-Mines =

- Commune
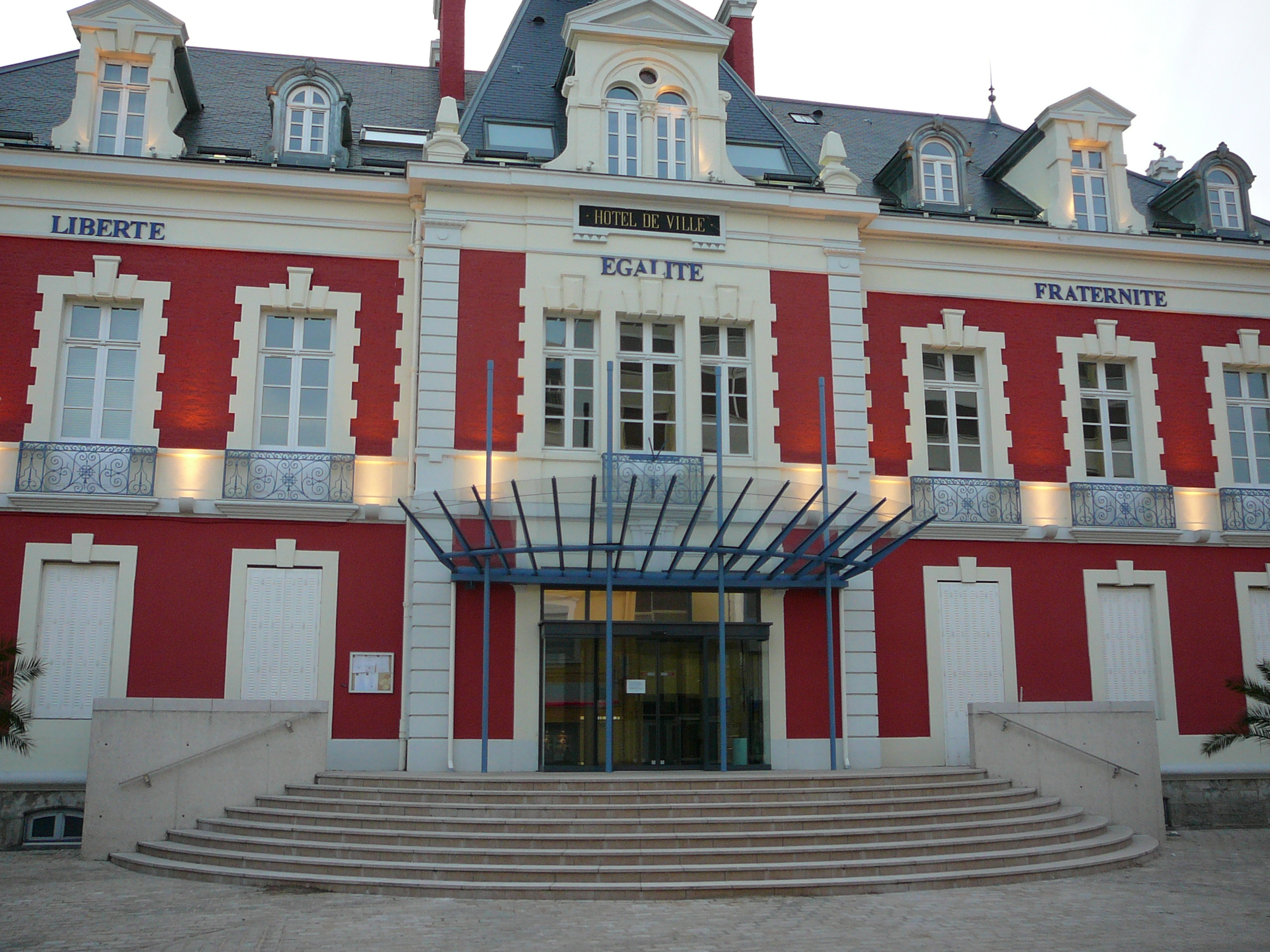
- Town hall

- Coat of arms
- Location of Montceau-les-Mines
- Location within France Location within Bourgogne-Franche-Comté
- Coordinates: 46°40′04″N 4°22′11″E
- Country: France
- Region: Bourgogne-Franche-Comté
- Department: Saône-et-Loire
- Arrondissement: Autun
- Canton: Montceau-les-Mines
- Intercommunality: CU Creusot Montceau

Government
  - Mayor (2026–32): Isabelle Louis (PS)
- Area^{1}: 16.62 km^{2} (6.42 sq mi)
- Elevation: 287 m (942 ft)
- Highest elevation: 326 m (1,070 ft)
- Lowest elevation: 274 m (899 ft)
- Population (2023): 17,064
  - Density: 1,027/km^{2} (2,659/sq mi)
- Demonym: Montcelliens
- Time zone: UTC+01:00 (CET)
  - Summer (DST): UTC+02:00 (CEST)
- INSEE/Postal code: 71306 /71300
- Website: www.montceaulesmines.fr
- ^{1} French Land Register data, which excludes lakes, ponds, glaciers > 1 km^{2} (0.386 sq mi or 247 acres) and river estuaries.

Montceau-les-Mines (French pronunciation: [mɔ̃so le min]; lit. 'Montceau-the-Mines') is a commune in the Saône-et-Loire department in the Bourgogne-Franche-Comté region in central-eastern France. It is the second-largest commune of the metropolitan Communauté urbaine Creusot Montceau, which lies southwest of the city of Dijon.

== History ==
Montceau-les-Mines is a former mining city. Coal was discovered in the area in the 16th Century. A hamlet called "Le Montceau" developed from this discovery.

"Le Montceau" began to grow after the building of the Canal du Centre, built between 1783 and 1791. A business entity, "Compagnie des mines", started to extract coals in 1833.

The commune was officially established June 24, 1856. as Montceau-les-Mines, a community of 1300 inhabitants, drawn from a territory formed from the villages of Blanzy, Saint-Vallier, Saint-Berain-sous-Sanvignes, and Sanvignes-les-Mines.

A graveyard and a church were built by the principal coal company, a sign of paternalism of mining industry.

Intense social movements took place at the end of the 19th century and at the beginning of the 20th century.

Coal made the city prosperous until 1918. During the War, the production reached 2,786,000 tons. There were about 30,000 inhabitants. After the war, the production started to decrease and stopped in 1992. Economic hardship followed the closing of the mines. By 2017, the population had fallen to about 18,000, unemployment was 21% and many shops of the city had closed.

== Population ==
Historical population
Year	Pop.	±% p.a.
1968	27,421	—
1975	28,177	+0.39%
1982	26,925	−0.65%
1990	22,999	−1.95%
1999	20,634	−1.20%
2007	19,548	−0.67%
2012	18,956	−0.61%
2017	18,398	−0.60%
2023	17,064	−1.25%
Source: INSEE

== Geography, geology and paleontology ==
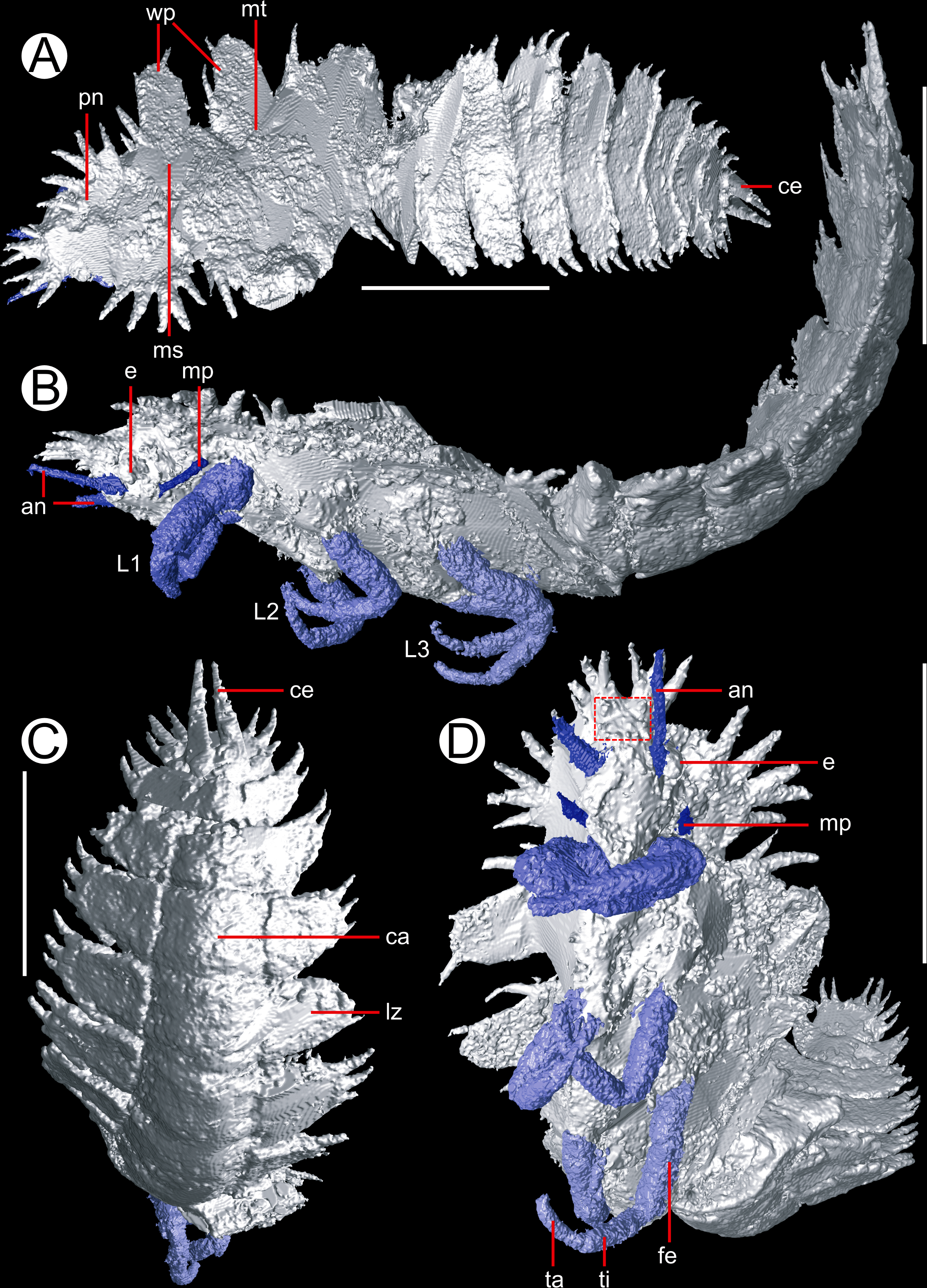
Anebos phrixos, an enigmatic insect larva

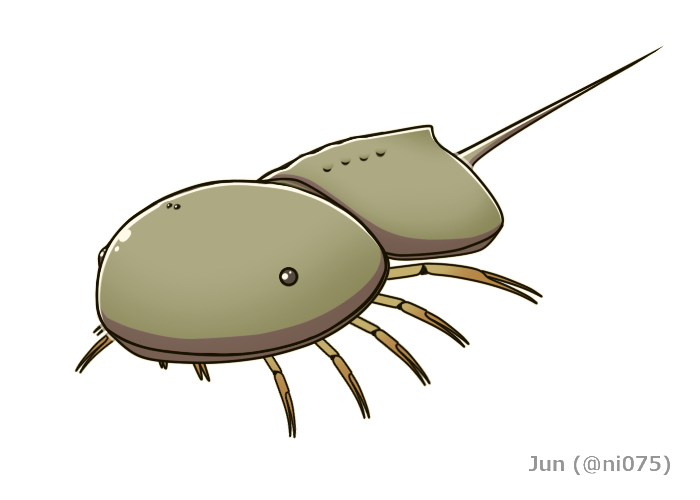
Alanops magnificus, a small freshwater xiphosuran

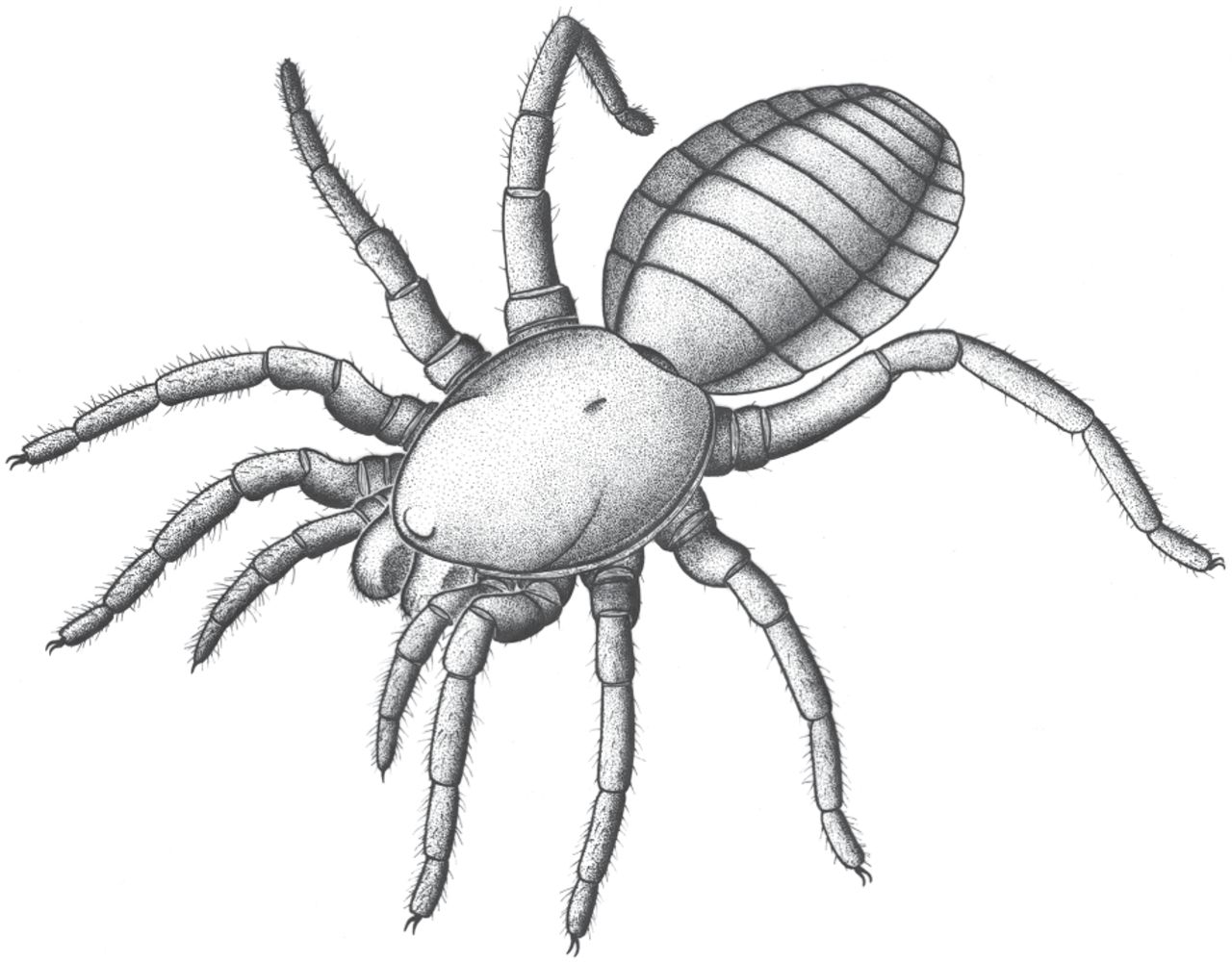
Idmonarachne brasieri, an arachnid close to spiders

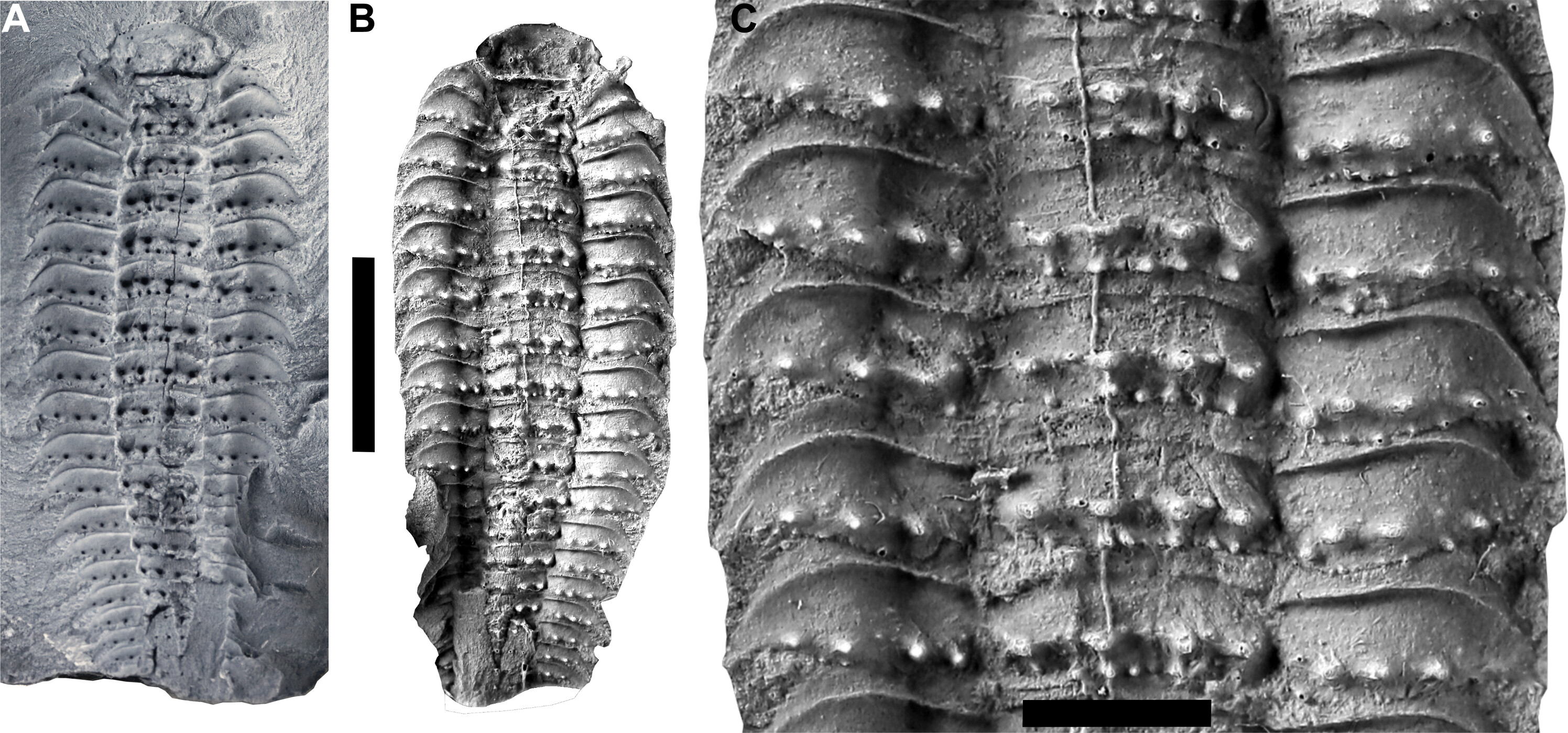
Arthropleura sp., a juvenile of giant millipede

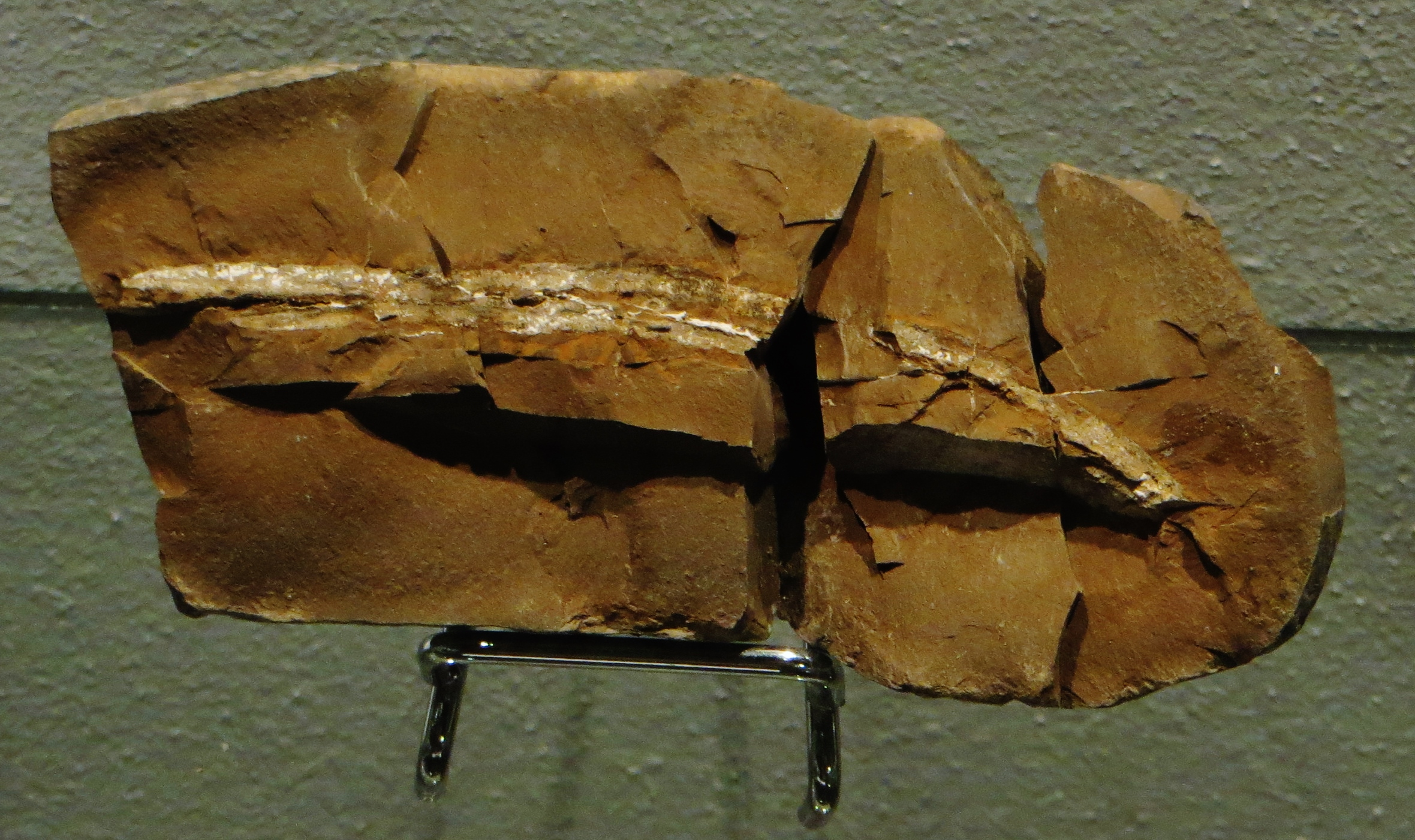
Myxineidus gononorum, an agnathan which is considered as hagfish or lamprey

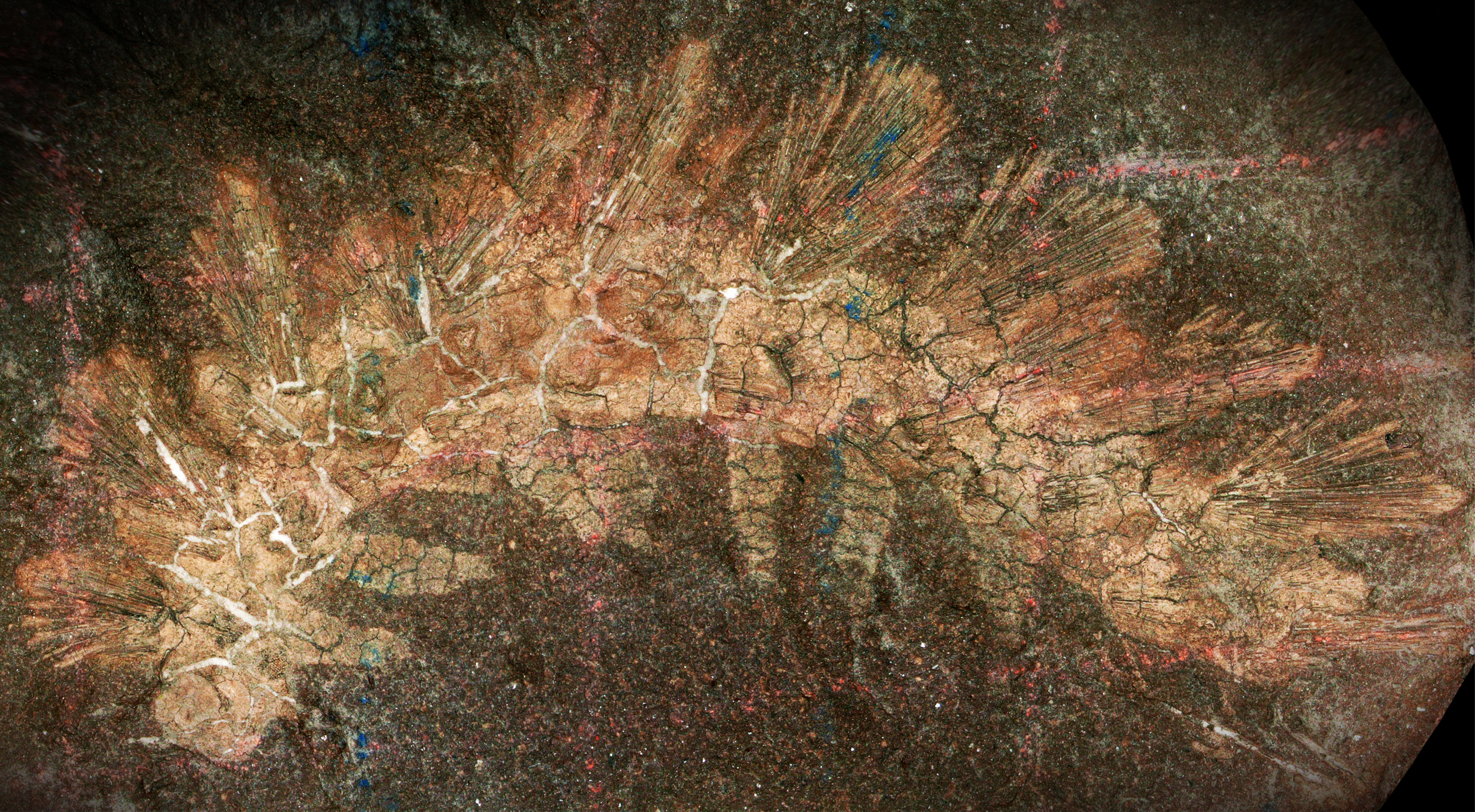
Palaeocampa, a lobopodian which was previously identified as an amphinomidan annelid

The Bourbince flows northward through the commune and crosses the town.

Exceptional preservation of Late Carboniferous fossil biota characterizes a Lagerstätte at Montceau-les-Mines. It has often been interpreted as a freshwater environment, sometimes even in high altitude. Some suggests marine influence of the site, but nearest marine environment is estimated to be several hundred kilometers away. In 2024, two juvenile Arthropleura specimens from the Kasimovian (~305 Ma) sediments of Montceau-les-Mines were used to study the animal's head in detail.

== See also ==
- Communes of the Saône-et-Loire department

== International relations ==
Montceau-les-Mines is twinned with:

- Żory in Poland
