= Emile Henry (ceramics) =

Emile Henry logo

Émile Henry Ltd. is a French ceramic ovenware, tableware, and kitchenware manufacturer based in Burgundy, France. It was founded in 1850.

== History ==
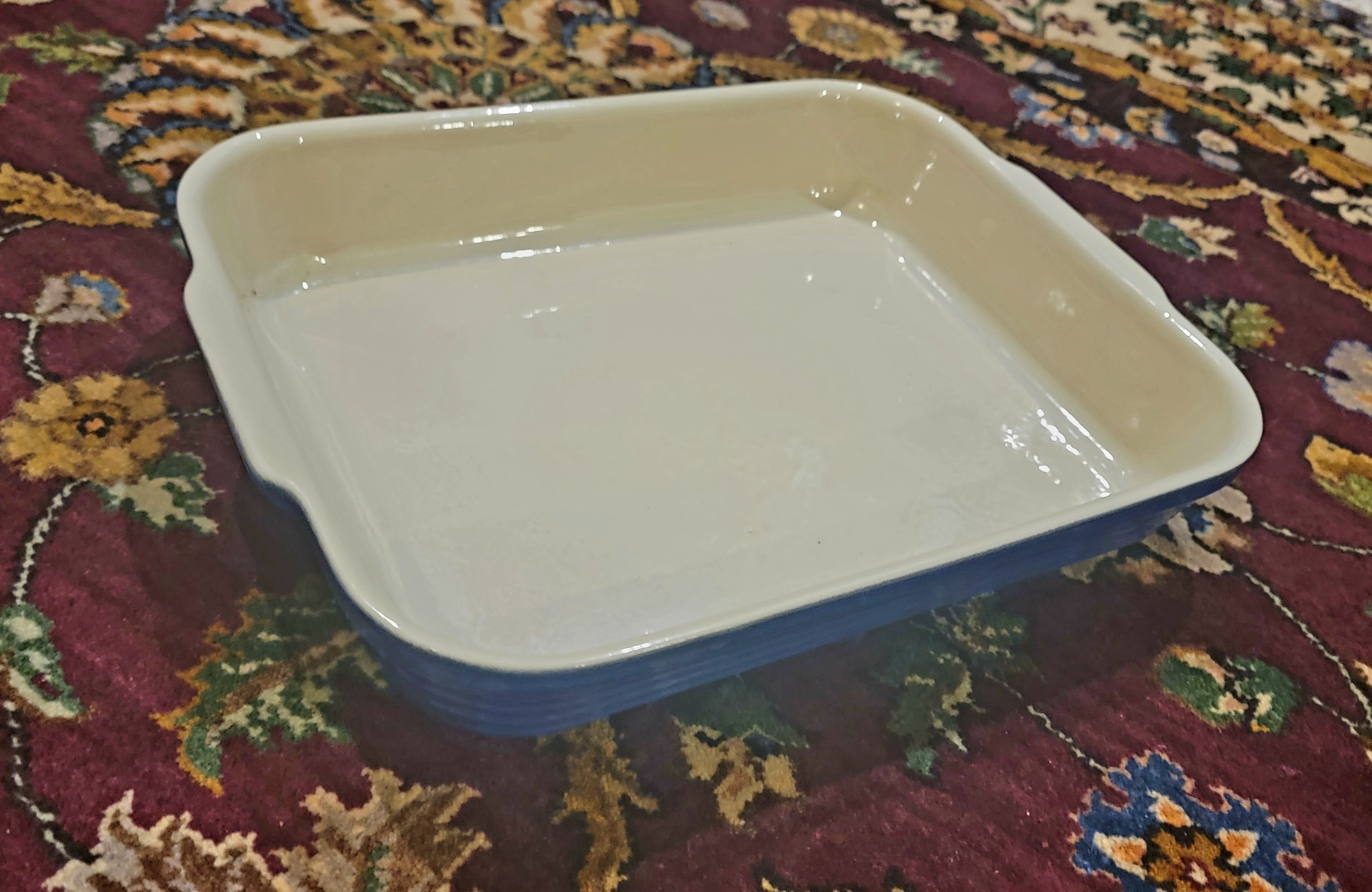
Emile Henry ceramic casserole dish from the 1980s

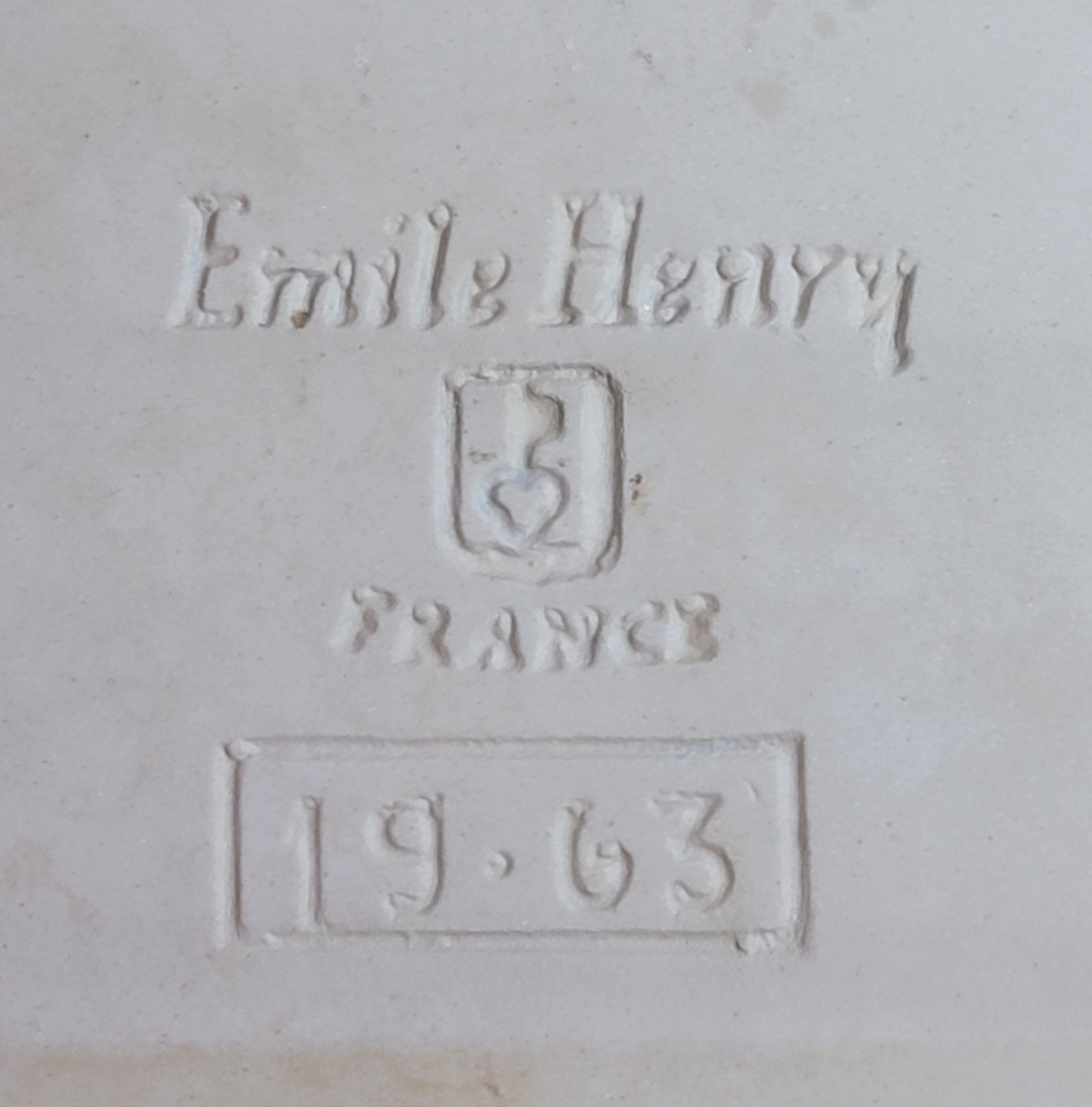
Emile Henry emblem on the bottom of a casserole dish from the 1980s

In 1850, Jacques Henry, a potter, opened a small workshop in Marcigny, southern Burgundy. Two manual wheels and two wood-fired kilns were used to make items including jugs, pots, casseroles, dishes, and plates. After his father died, Paul Henry took over and extended his client base in Paris from 1882 until 1894. The kilns were powered by coal and employed forty employees. The manual wheels were replaced by mechanical wheels that ran on gas. Steam, a symbol of power and freedom, revolutionized the manufacturing process in 1912.

In 1922, Emile Henry took over the firm. He was born in 1885 and enlisted in the army in the year 1914. Metal cookware manufacturers were big rivals, and several potteries were forced to close. Customers in Paris remained loyal and accounted for 40% of total purchases. Fifty workers were employed at this point, and the completed goods were either not glazed for horticulture use or glazed for culinary usage. When Emile died in 1950, Maurice Henry became the company's president at the age of 32. From 1950 to 1975, the production rose dramatically. Horticultural pottery was phased out around 1980 to focus only on glazed culinary pottery.

After 9 years of running the firm with his father, Maurice, Jacques Henry established new goals: Emile Henry was awarded the ISO 9001 international quality standard in 2002. Jean-Baptiste Henry, Jacques' son, took over the family company in 2012.
