= Saône-et-Loire =

Department in Bourgogne-Franche-Comté, France

Saône-et-Loire Sona-et-Lêre (Arpitan)
- Department of France
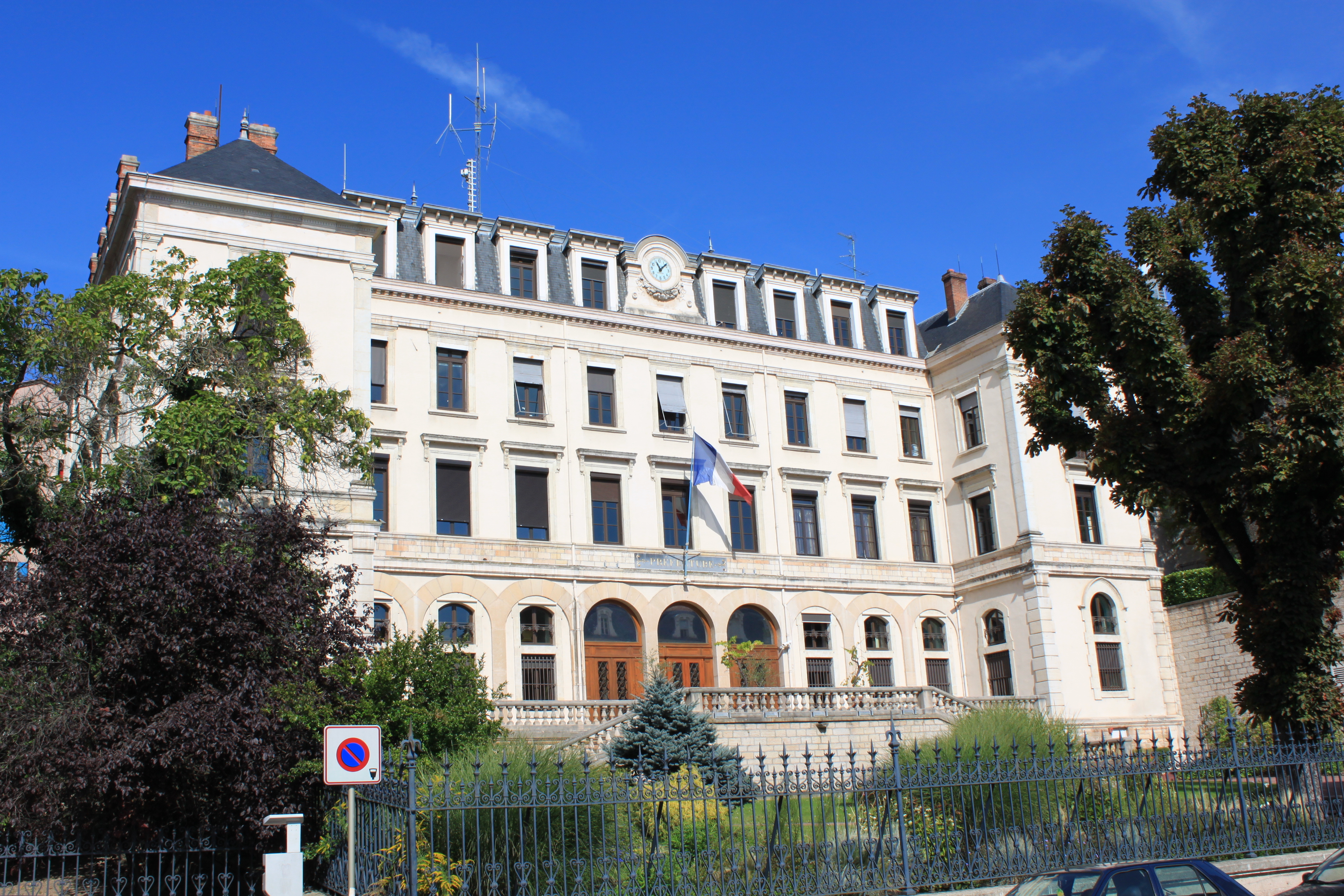
- Prefecture building in Mâcon

- Flag Coat of arms

- Location of Saône-et-Loire in France
- Coordinates: 46°40′N 04°42′E
- Country: France
- Region: Bourgogne-Franche-Comté
- Prefecture: Mâcon
- Subprefectures: Autun; Chalon-sur-Saône; Charolles; Louhans-Châteaurenaud

Government
  - President of the Departmental Council: André Accary (LR)

Area^{1}
  - Total: 8,575 km^{2} (3,311 sq mi)

Population (2023)
  - Total: 550,310
  - Rank: 48th
  - Density: 64.18/km^{2} (166.2/sq mi)
- Time zone: UTC+1 (CET)
  - Summer (DST): UTC+2 (CEST)
- ISO 3166 code: FR-71
- Department number: 71
- Arrondissements: 5
- Cantons: 29
- Communes: 563
- ^1 French Land Register data, which exclude estuaries and lakes, ponds and glaciers larger than 1 km^{2}

Saône-et-Loire (French pronunciation: [son‿elwaʁ]; Arpitan: Sona-et-Lêre; lit. 'Saône and Loire') is a department in the Bourgogne-Franche-Comté region in France. It is named after the rivers Saône and Loire, between which it lies, in the country's central-eastern part. Its prefecture is Mâcon, with subprefectures in Autun, Chalon-sur-Saône, Charolles and Louhans-Châteaurenaud.

Saône-et-Loire is Bourgogne-Franche-Comté's most populous department with a population of 550,310 as of 2023. It is also its southernmost department, on the regional border with Auvergne-Rhône-Alpes. Its INSEE and postcode number is 71.

== History ==
When it was formed during the French Revolution, as of 4 March 1790 in fulfillment of the law of 22 December 1789, the new department combined parts of the provinces of southern Burgundy and Bresse, uniting lands that had no previous common history nor political unity and which have no true geographical unity. Thus its history is that of Burgundy, and is especially to be found in the local histories of Autun, Mâcon, Chalon-sur-Saône, Charolles and Louhans-Châteaurenaud.

== Geography ==
Saône-et-Loire is the seventh-largest department of France. It is part of the Bourgogne-Franche-Comté region. In the west, the department is composed of the hills of the Autunois, the region around Autun, in the southwest the Charollais, and the Mâconnais in the south.

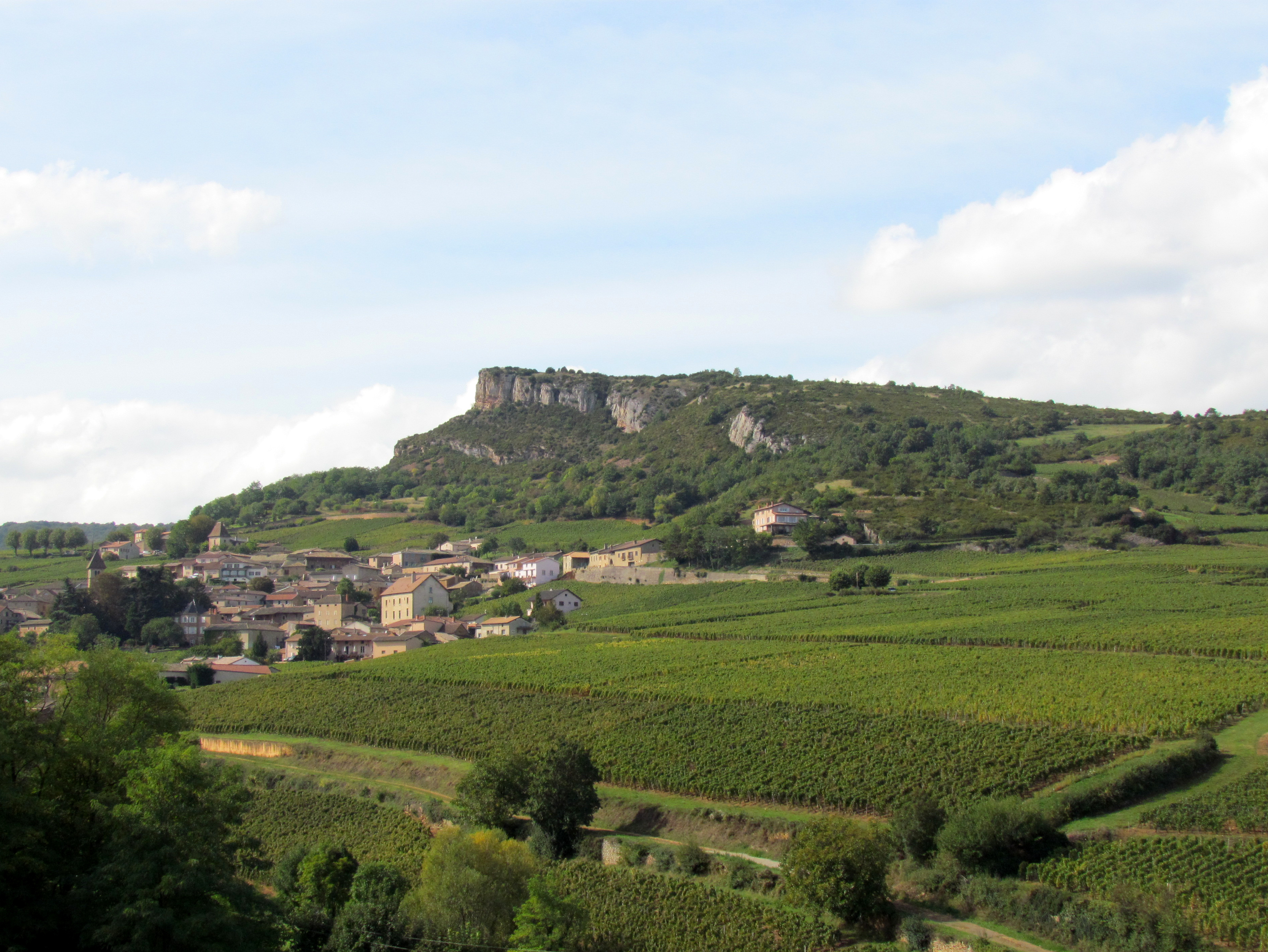
Vineyards in Vergisson

In the centre, the department is traversed from north to south by the Saône in its wide plain; the Saône is a tributary of the Rhône which joins it at Lyon and thus is connected to the Mediterranean. The source of the Loire, is south of the department, in the department of Ardèche. It then makes its way in the opposite direction, forming the southwest border of the department, and eventually draining into the Atlantic Ocean.

The Canal du Centre links the Saône to the Loire between Chalon-sur-Saône and Digoin, thereby linking the Mediterranean Sea to the Atlantic Ocean. In the east, the department occupies the northern part of the plain of Bresse. In the west, its industrial heart is in Le Creusot and Montceau-les-Mines, formerly noted for their coal mines and metallurgy.

The LGV Sud-Est traverses Saône-et-Loire from north to south, serving two stations: Le Creusot TGV and Mâcon-Loché TGV. Both were the first stations in France to be opened specifically for the TGV.

=== Principal cities ===
The most populous commune is Chalon-sur-Saône; the prefecture Mâcon is the second-most populous. As of 2023, there are 5 communes with more than 10,000 inhabitants:

Commune	Population (2023)
Chalon-sur-Saône	45,102
Mâcon	35,177
Le Creusot	20,509
Montceau-les-Mines	17,064
Autun	13,172

=== Subdivisions ===
The department consists of five arrondissements:

- Autun
- Chalon-sur-Saône
- Charolles
- Louhans
- Mâcon

There are 29 cantons in the department and 563 communes.

== Demographics ==
Historical population

Year	Pop.	±% p.a.
1801	452,673	—
1806	471,236	+0.81%
1821	498,057	+0.37%
1831	524,180	+0.51%
1841	551,543	+0.51%
1851	574,720	+0.41%
1861	582,137	+0.13%
1872	598,344	+0.25%
1881	625,589	+0.50%
1891	619,523	−0.10%
1901	620,360	+0.01%
1911	604,446	−0.26%
1921	554,816	−0.85%
1931	538,741	−0.29%

Year	Pop.	±% p.a.
1936	525,676	−0.49%
1946	506,749	−0.37%
1954	511,182	+0.11%
1962	535,772	+0.59%
1968	550,364	+0.45%
1975	569,810	+0.50%
1982	571,852	+0.05%
1990	559,413	−0.27%
1999	544,893	−0.29%
2007	551,842	+0.16%
2012	555,039	+0.12%
2017	553,595	−0.05%
2023	550,310	−0.10%

== Politics ==
The president of the Departmental Council of Saône-et-Loire is André Accary of The Republicans, first elected in 2015.

=== Representation in Paris ===
==== National Assembly ====
Constituency	Member	Party	Since
Saône-et-Loire's 1st	Benjamin Dirx	RE	2017
Saône-et-Loire's 2nd	Josiane Corneloup	LR	2017
Saône-et-Loire's 3rd	Aurélien Dutremble	RN	2024
Saône-et-Loire's 4th	Éric Michoux	UDR	2024
Saône-et-Loire's 5th	Lionel Duparay	LR	2025

==== Senate ====
Senator	Party	Since
Fabien Genet	LR	2020
Paulette Matray	PS	2025
Marie Mercier	LR	2015

== Tourism ==
Touristic sites include:

- Roche de Solutré,
- Abbaye de Cluny,
- Taizé and Taizé Community,
- Paray-le-Monial,
- La Clayette,
- Dompierre-les-Ormes (Galerie européenne de la forêt et du bois, Arboretum de Pézanin).
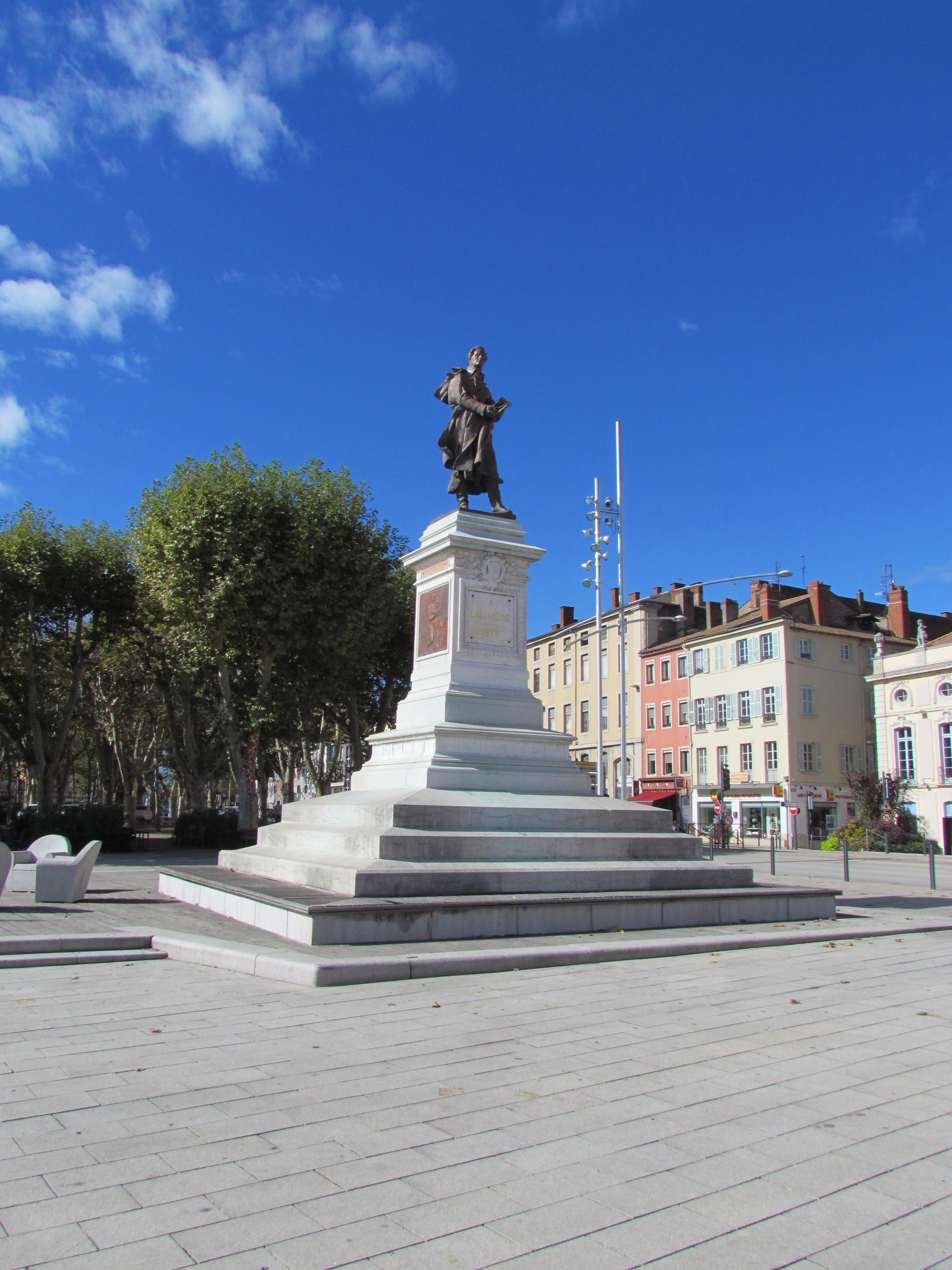
Lamartine's statue in Mâcon

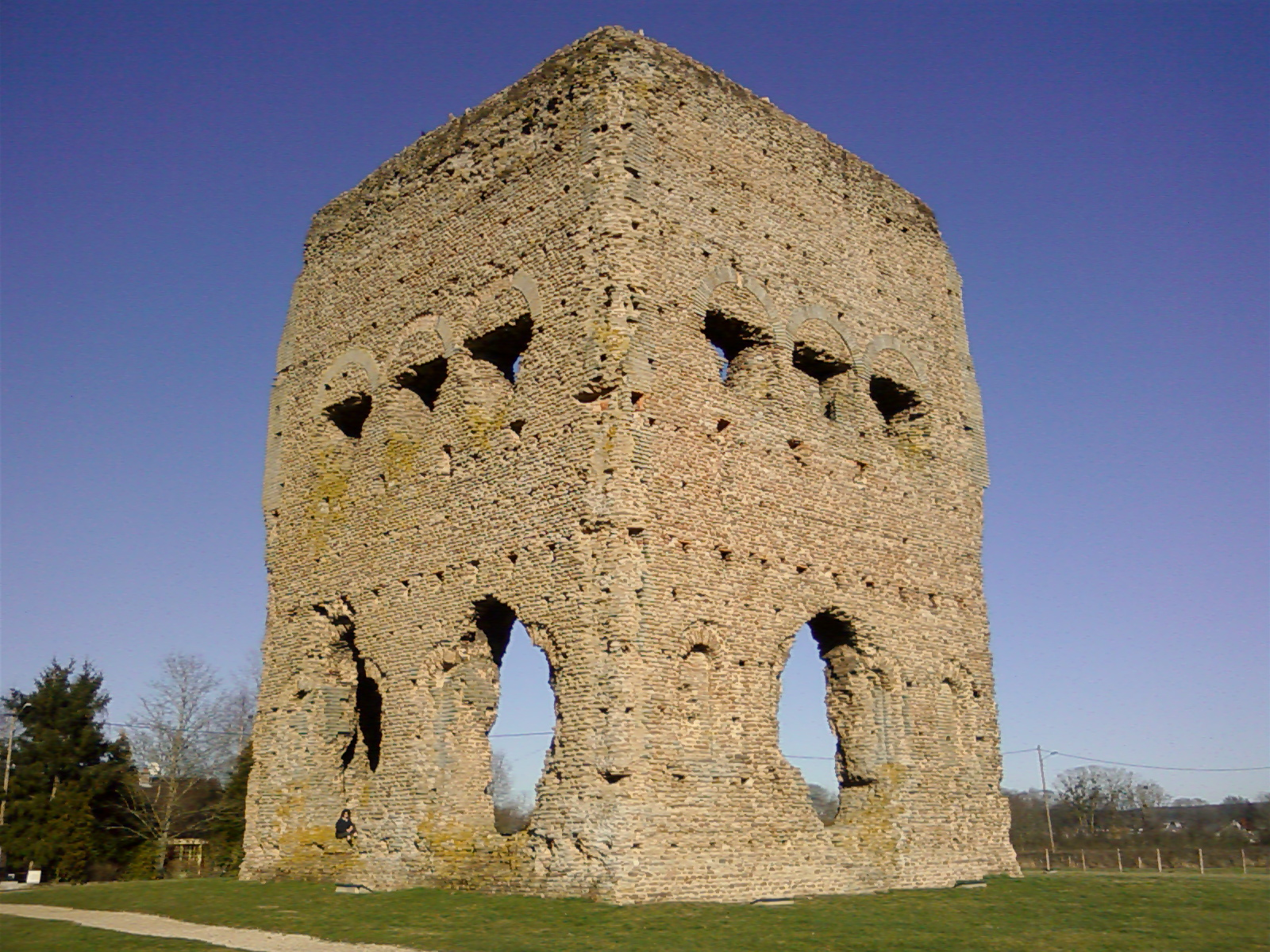
Temple of Janus in Autun

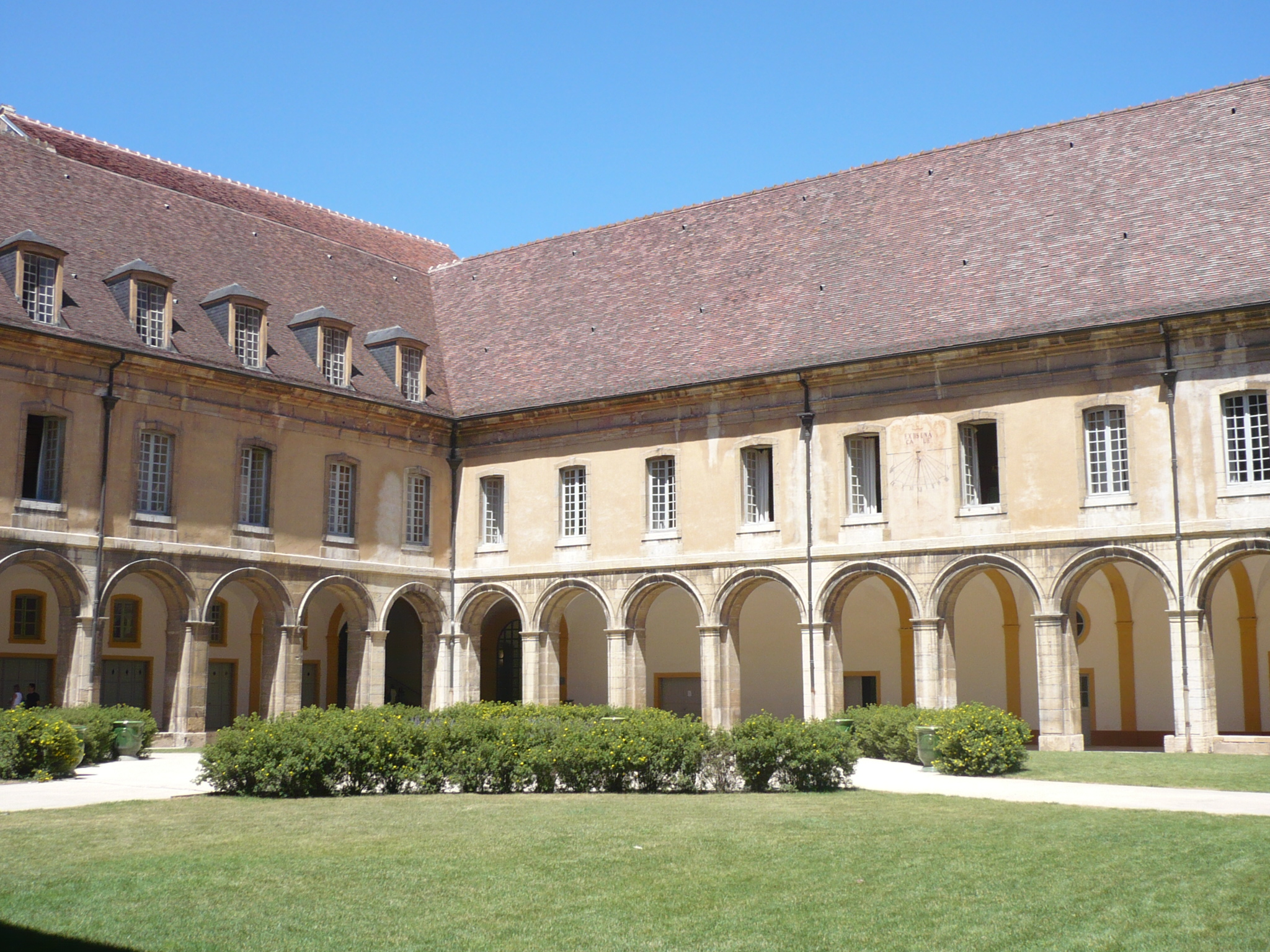
Cluny Abbey

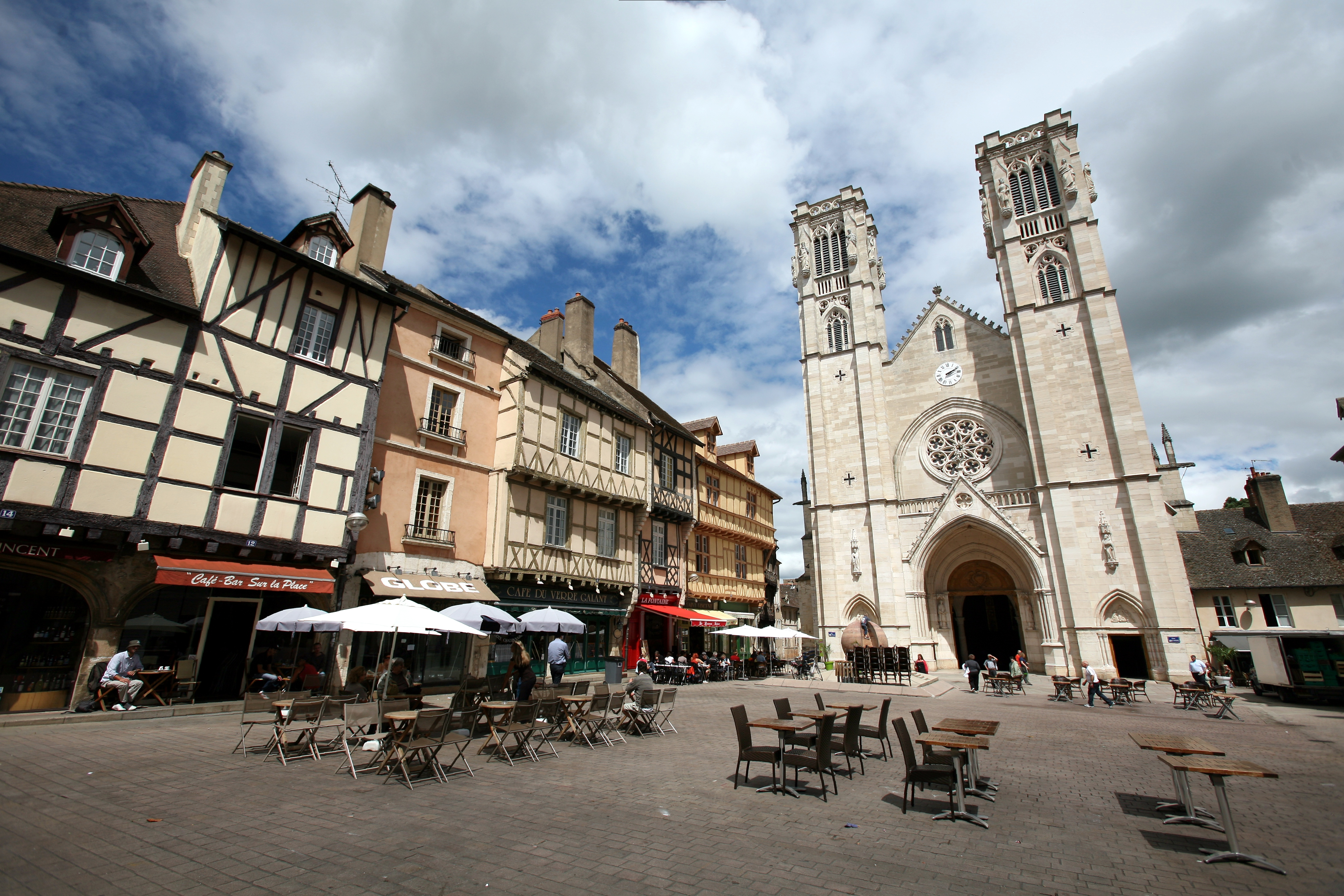
Chalon-sur-Saône

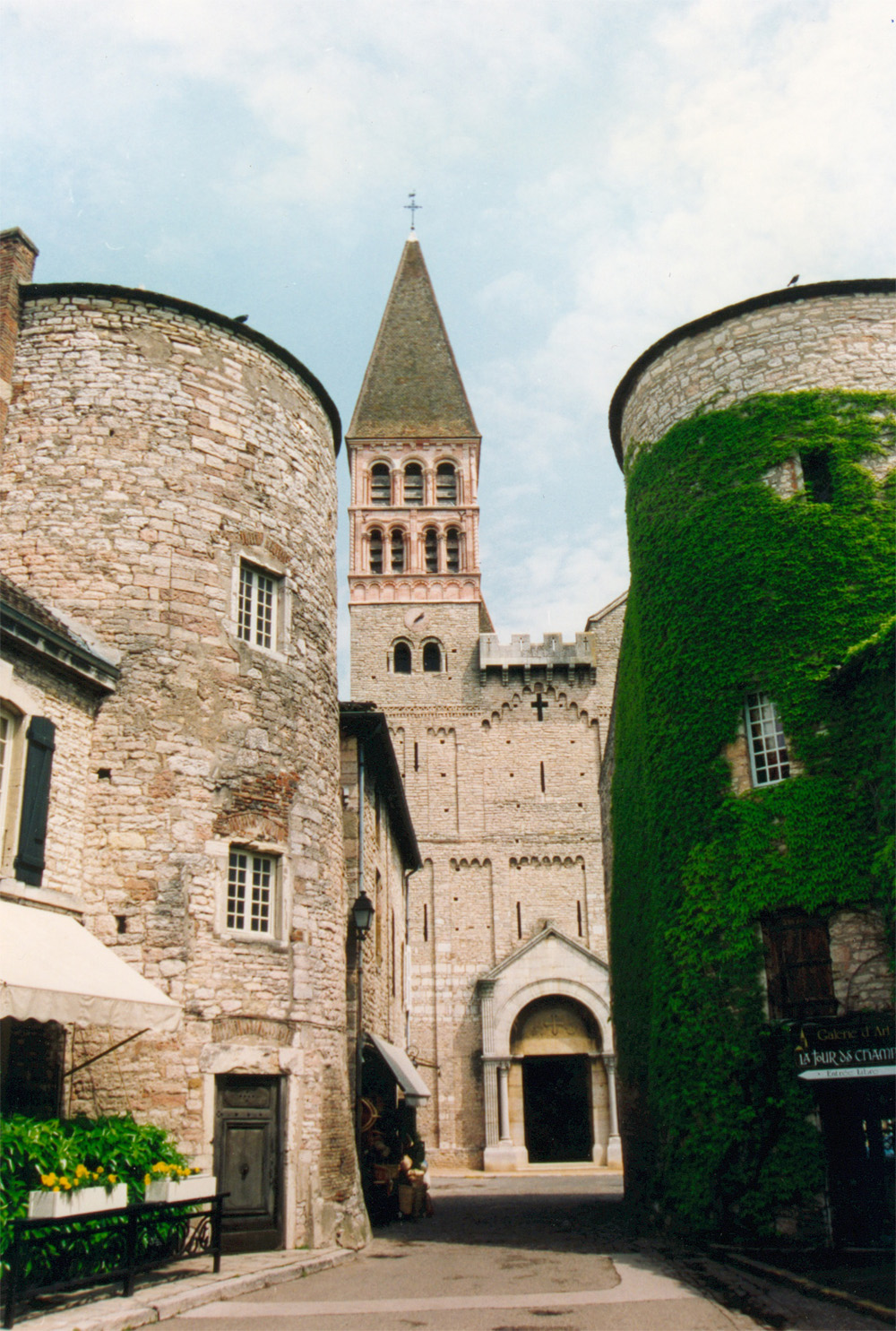
Tournus

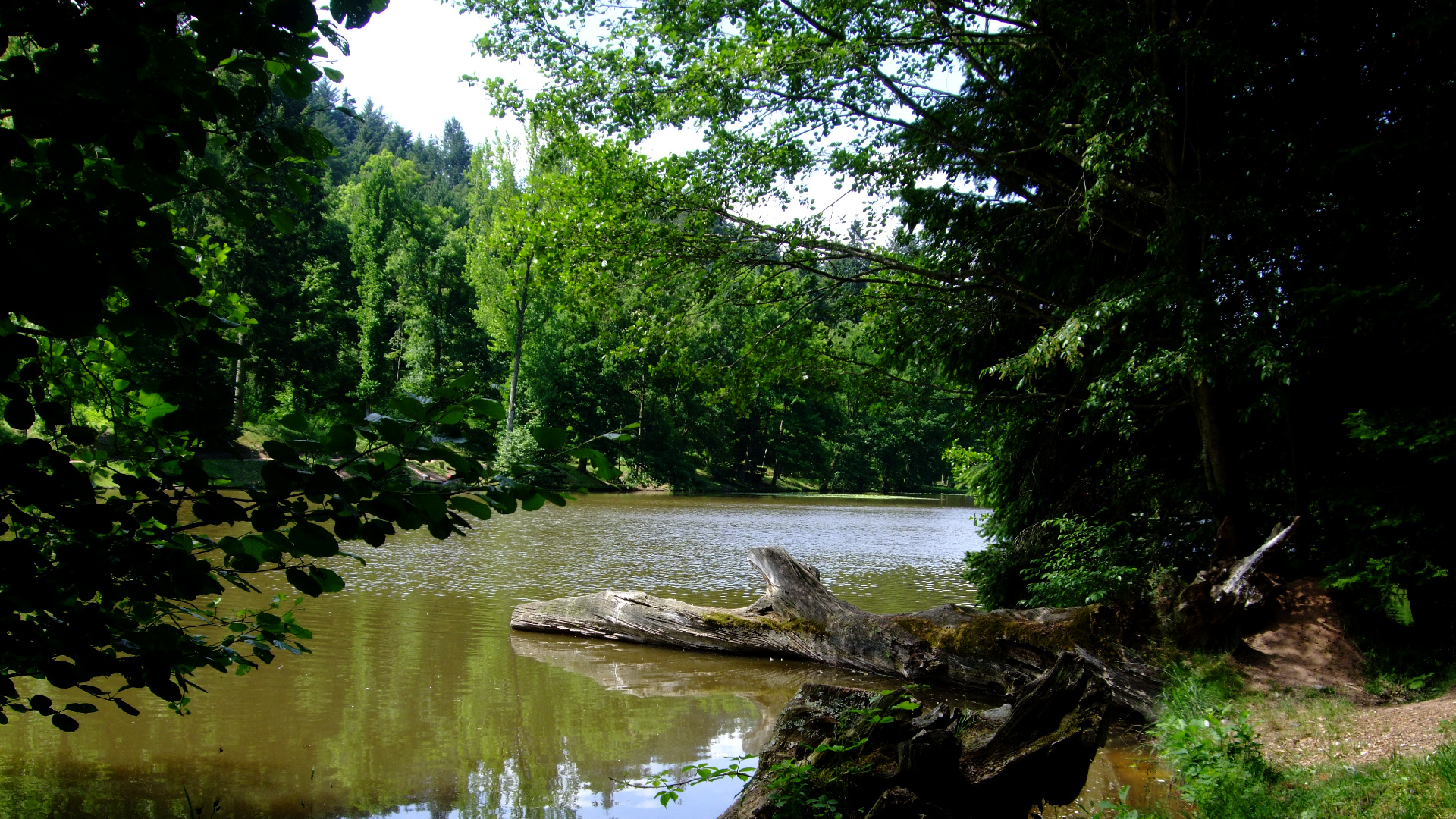
Lake of Pézanin

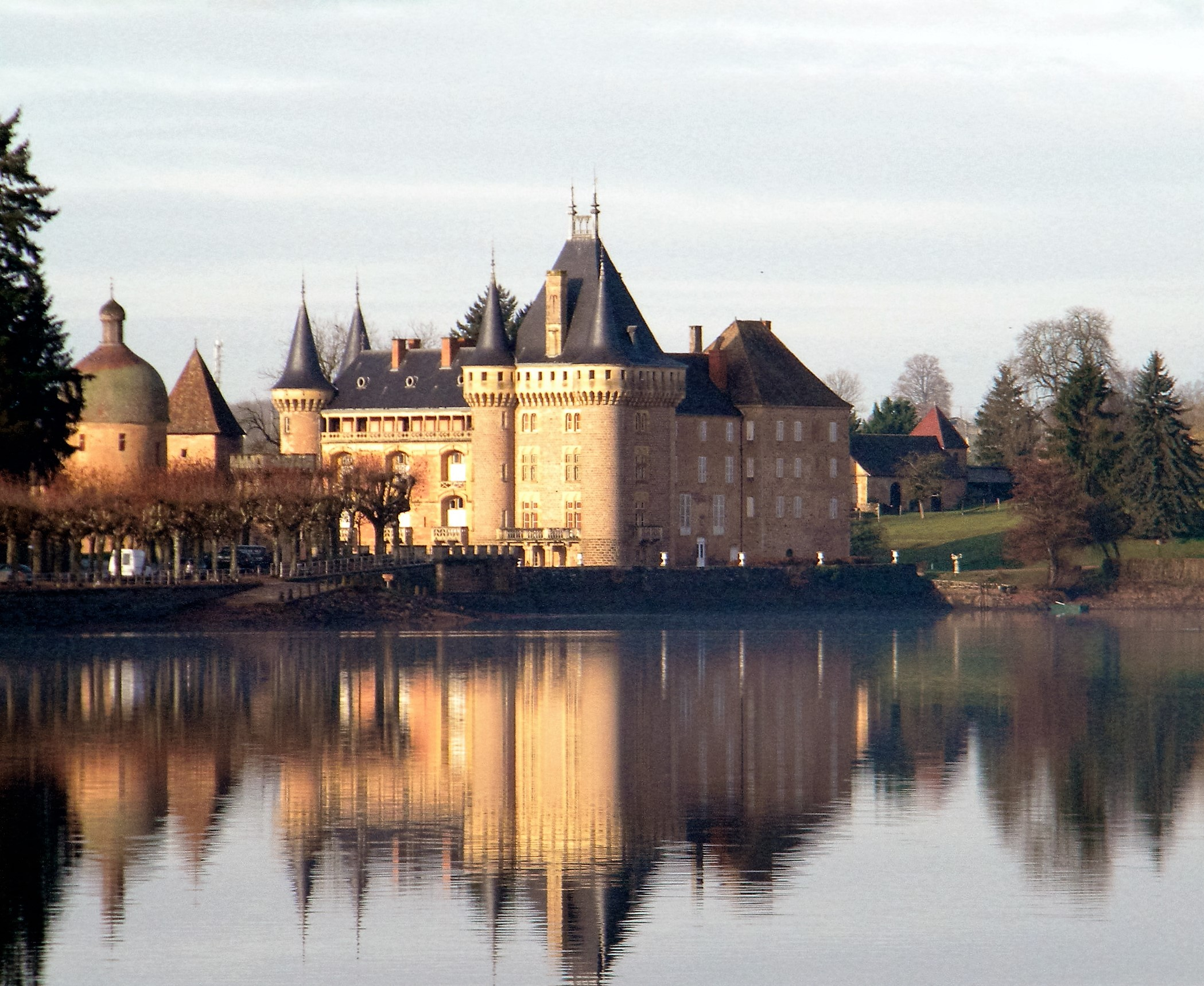
Château de La Clayette

== See also ==
- Mâcon
- Cantons of the Saône-et-Loire department
- Communes of the Saône-et-Loire department
- Arrondissements of the Saône-et-Loire department
- Chizerots
- Les Télots Mine
- Charolais-Brionnais region, known for its beef and its goats' cheese
- A6 disappearances
