= Uxeau =

- Commune
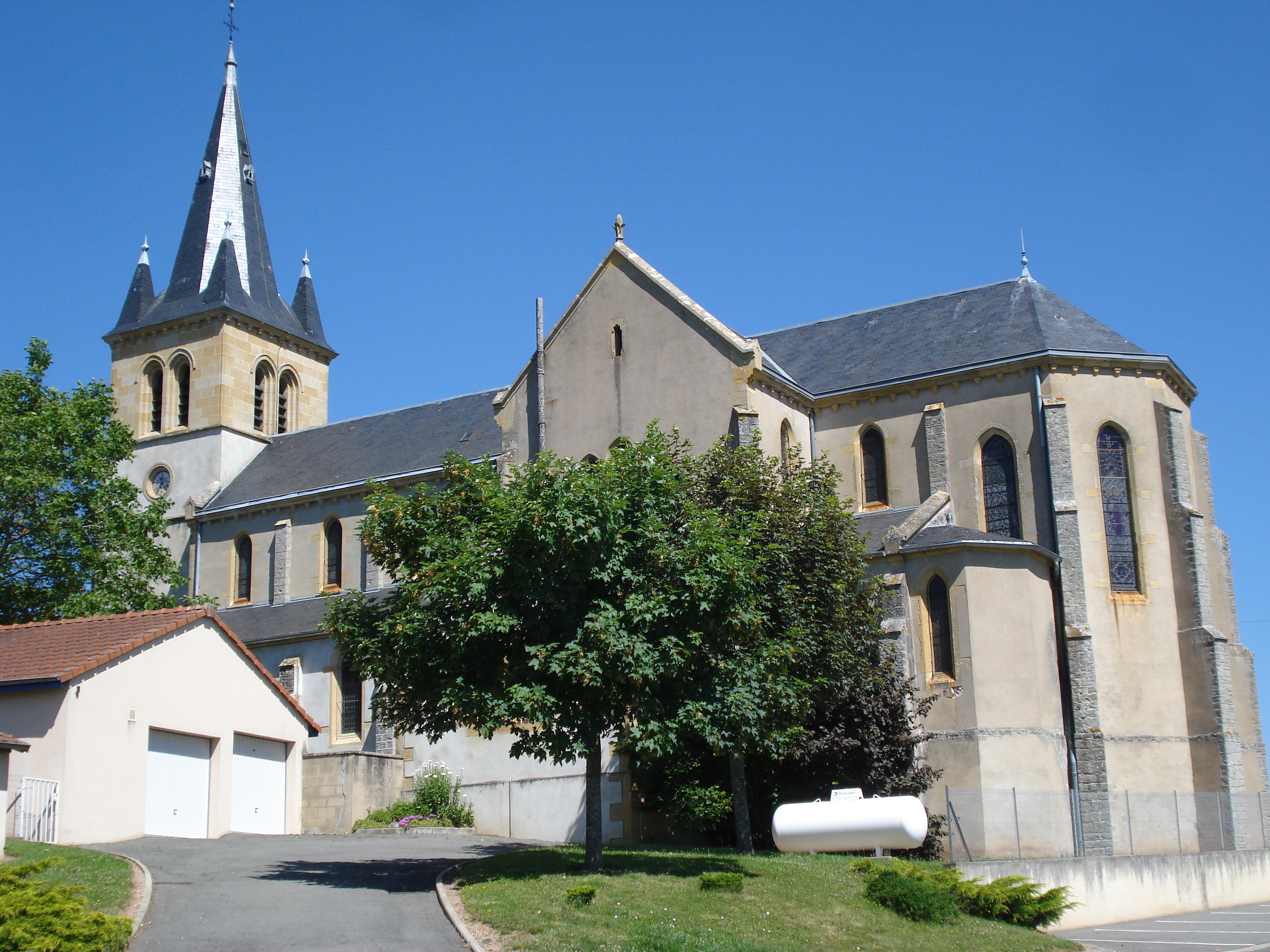
- Location of Uxeau
- Location within France Location within Bourgogne-Franche-Comté
- Coordinates: 46°39′49″N 4°01′30″E
- Country: France
- Region: Bourgogne-Franche-Comté
- Department: Saône-et-Loire
- Arrondissement: Charolles
- Canton: Gueugnon

Government
  - Mayor (2020–2026): Jean-Luc Nivot
- Area^{1}: 32.75 km^{2} (12.64 sq mi)
- Elevation: 405 m (1,329 ft)
- Highest elevation: 505 m (1,657 ft)
- Lowest elevation: 244 m (801 ft)
- Population (2023): 486
  - Density: 14.8/km^{2} (38.4/sq mi)
- Time zone: UTC+01:00 (CET)
  - Summer (DST): UTC+02:00 (CEST)
- INSEE/Postal code: 71552 /71130
- ^{1} French Land Register data, which excludes lakes, ponds, glaciers > 1 km^{2} (0.386 sq mi or 247 acres) and river estuaries.

Uxeau is a commune in the Saône-et-Loire department in the region of Bourgogne-Franche-Comté in eastern France.

== Geography ==
Uxeau is located in the southwest of Saône-et-Loire at 150 km from Dijon and in the middle between Dijon and Clermont-Ferrand. Uxeau is located in the canton of Gueugnon, a small industrial town. Many of the inhabitants of Uxeau work or have worked at the steel works of Aperam in Gueugnon. The summit of the Mont Dardon is in the commune of Uxeau. The Mont Dardon is located in the communes of Uxeau, Sainte-Radegonde and Issy-l'Évêque.

== See also ==
- Communes of the Saône-et-Loire department
