= Rigny-sur-Arroux =

- Commune
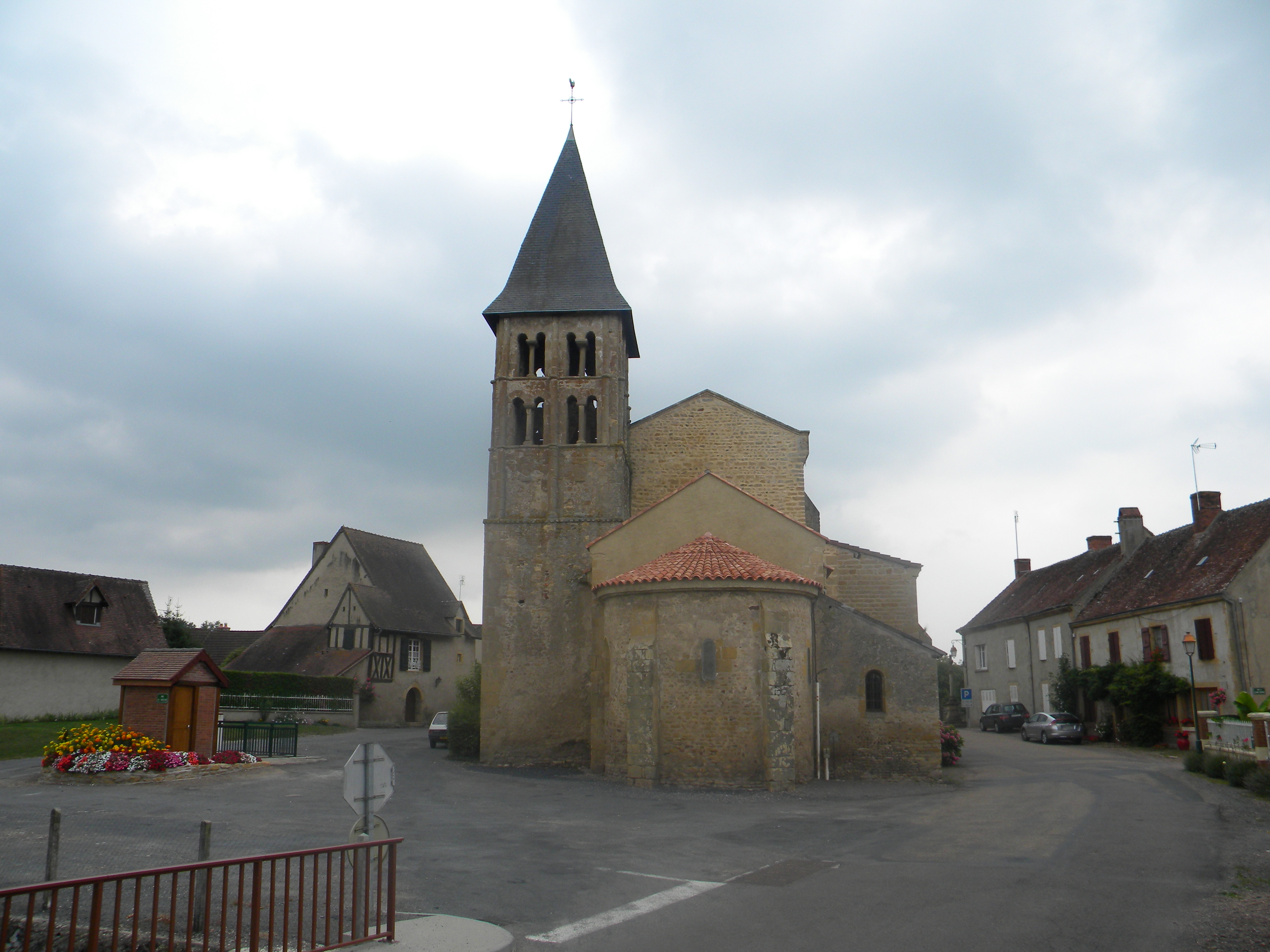
- The church in Rigny-sur-Arroux
- Location of Rigny-sur-Arroux
- Location within France Location within Bourgogne-Franche-Comté
- Coordinates: 46°32′00″N 4°01′43″E
- Country: France
- Region: Bourgogne-Franche-Comté
- Department: Saône-et-Loire
- Arrondissement: Charolles
- Canton: Gueugnon

Government
  - Mayor (2020–2026): Patrice Bernard
- Area^{1}: 48.17 km^{2} (18.60 sq mi)
- Elevation: 240 m (790 ft)
- Highest elevation: 347 m (1,138 ft)
- Lowest elevation: 227 m (745 ft)
- Population (2023): 613
  - Density: 12.7/km^{2} (33.0/sq mi)
- Time zone: UTC+01:00 (CET)
  - Summer (DST): UTC+02:00 (CEST)
- INSEE/Postal code: 71370 /71160
- ^{1} French Land Register data, which excludes lakes, ponds, glaciers > 1 km^{2} (0.386 sq mi or 247 acres) and river estuaries.

Rigny-sur-Arroux (French pronunciation: [ʁiɲi syʁ aʁu], literally Rigny on Arroux) is a commune in the east-central French department of Saône-et-Loire, Bourgogne-Franche-Comté.

The discovery in 1874 of a cache of Solutrean laurel-leaf flint points in the hamlet of Volgu, just south of the village proper, indicates that the environs of the present-day Rigny were inhabited or frequented by Paleolithic peoples around 20,000 years ago.

== See also ==
- Communes of the Saône-et-Loire department
