= Lucenay-l'Évêque =

- Commune
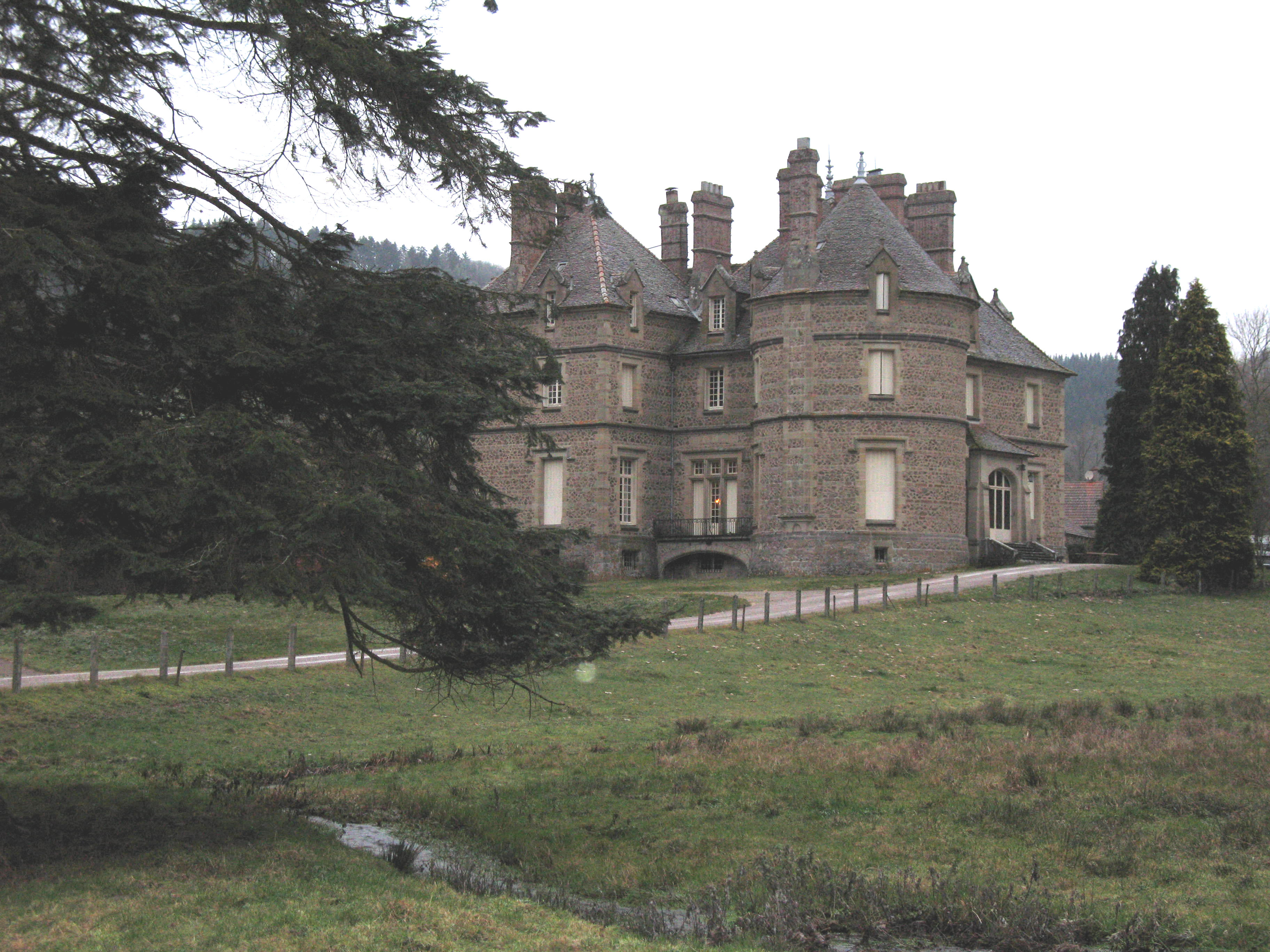
- The Château de Visigneux in Lucenay-l'Évêque, winter 2008

- Coat of arms
- Location of Lucenay-l'Évêque
- Location within France Location within Bourgogne-Franche-Comté
- Coordinates: 47°04′54″N 4°14′47″E
- Country: France
- Region: Bourgogne-Franche-Comté
- Department: Saône-et-Loire
- Arrondissement: Autun
- Canton: Autun-1
- Intercommunality: CC du Grand Autunois Morvan
- Area^{1}: 25.36 km^{2} (9.79 sq mi)
- Elevation: 343 m (1,125 ft)
- Highest elevation: 566 m (1,857 ft)
- Lowest elevation: 327 m (1,073 ft)
- Population (2023): 333
  - Density: 13.1/km^{2} (34.0/sq mi)
- Time zone: UTC+01:00 (CET)
  - Summer (DST): UTC+02:00 (CEST)
- INSEE/Postal code: 71266 /71540
- ^{1} French Land Register data, which excludes lakes, ponds, glaciers > 1 km^{2} (0.386 sq mi or 247 acres) and river estuaries.

Lucenay-l'Évêque (French pronunciation: [lysnɛ levɛk]; lit. 'Lucenay-the-Bishop') is a rural commune in the Saône-et-Loire department in the Bourgogne-Franche-Comté region in central-east France. It is part of Morvan Regional Natural Park.

== Geography ==
The commune is in the far northwestern corner of the department, northwest of Autun. It is on the departmental border with Côte-d'Or at Manlay.

The village lies in the Morvan massif, on the shores of the Ternin, a tributary to the Arroux.

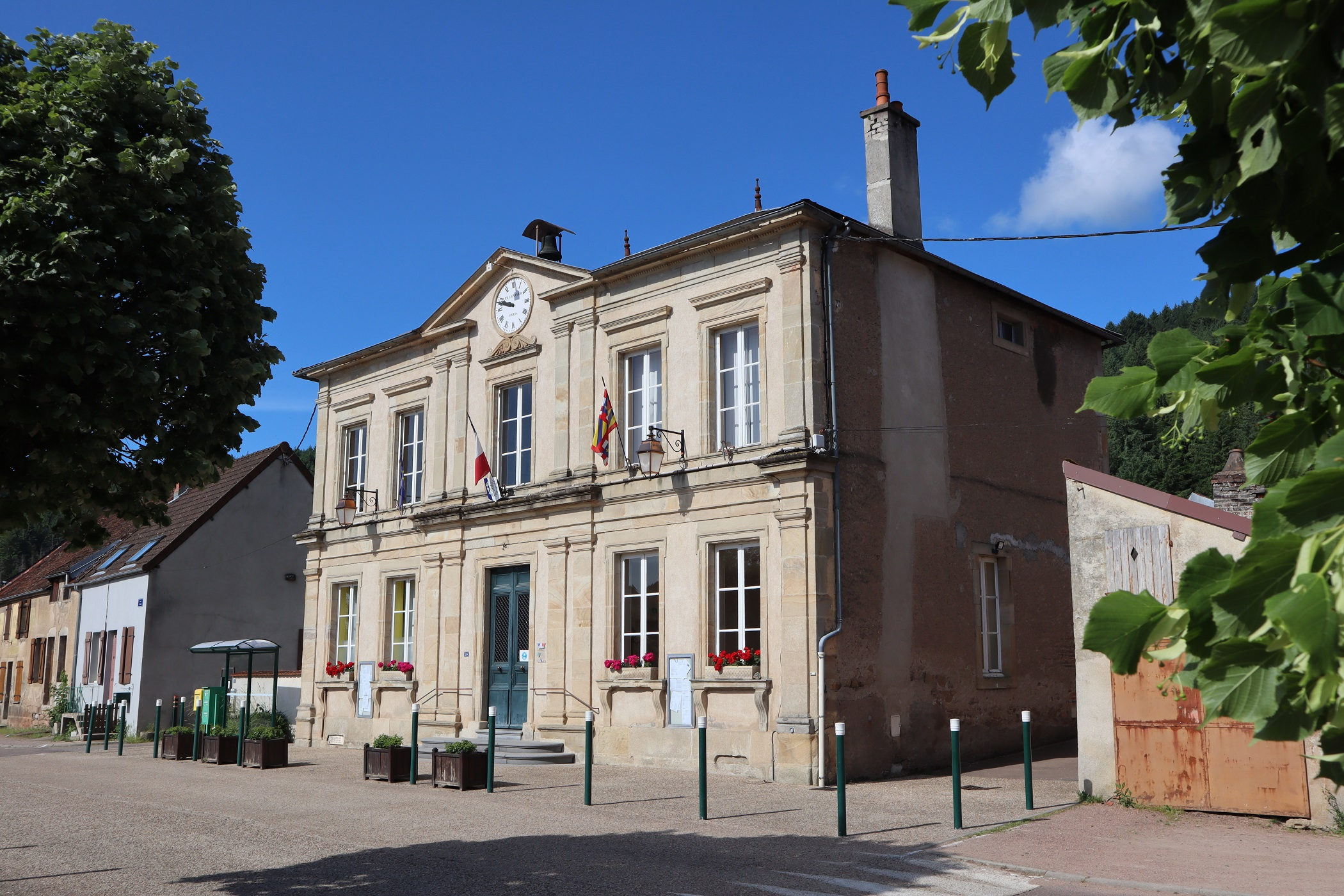
Town hall

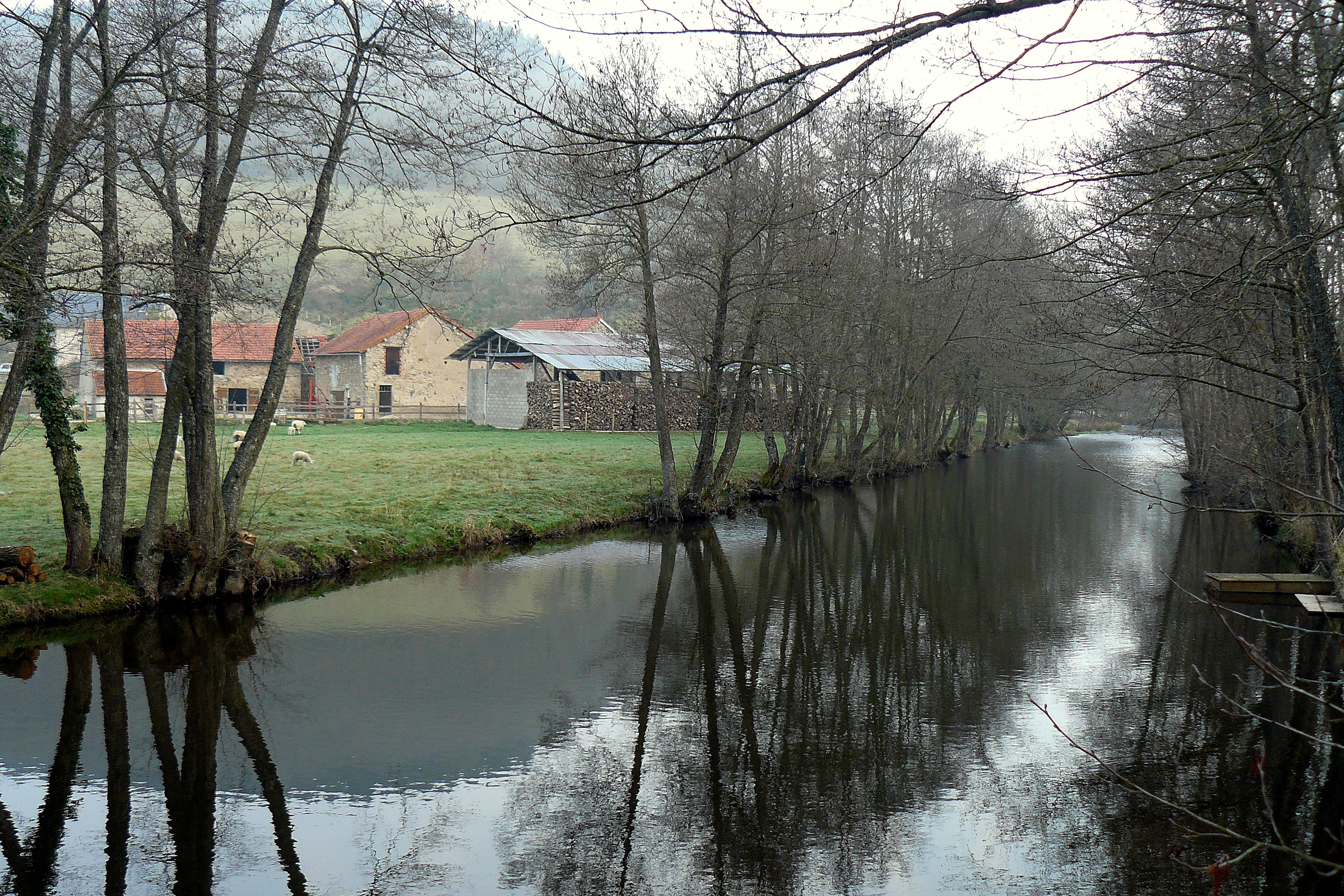
The Ternin at Lucenay-l'Évêque

== See also ==
- Communes of the Saône-et-Loire department
- Morvan Regional Natural Park
