= Marly-sur-Arroux =

- Commune
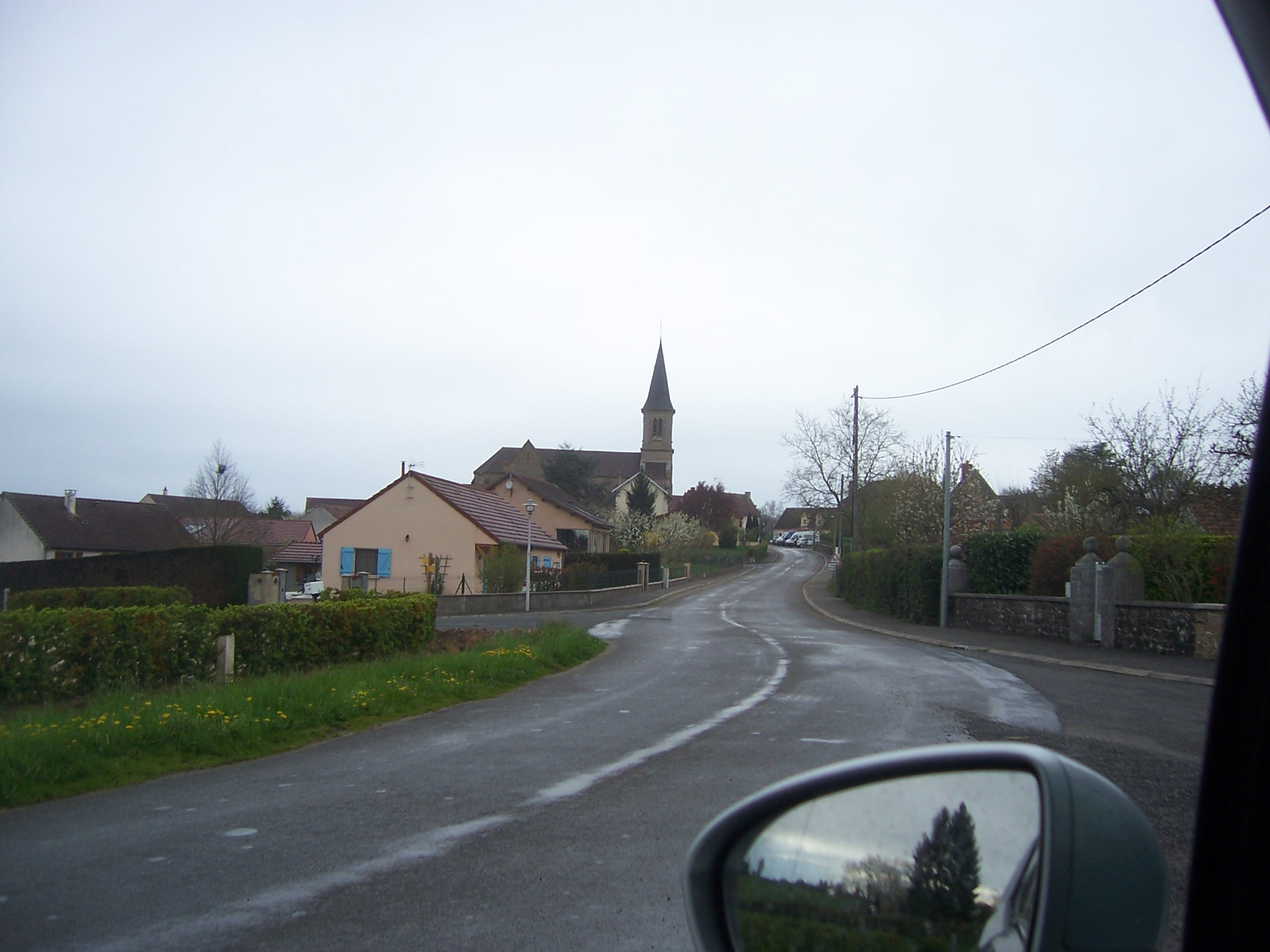
- A general view of Marly-sur-Arroux
- Location of Marly-sur-Arroux
- Location within France Location within Bourgogne-Franche-Comté
- Coordinates: 46°37′10″N 4°08′05″E
- Country: France
- Region: Bourgogne-Franche-Comté
- Department: Saône-et-Loire
- Arrondissement: Charolles
- Canton: Gueugnon
- Area^{1}: 25.6 km^{2} (9.9 sq mi)
- Elevation: 337 m (1,106 ft)
- Highest elevation: 392 m (1,286 ft)
- Lowest elevation: 253 m (830 ft)
- Population (2023): 301
  - Density: 11.8/km^{2} (30.5/sq mi)
- Time zone: UTC+01:00 (CET)
  - Summer (DST): UTC+02:00 (CEST)
- INSEE/Postal code: 71281 /71420
- ^{1} French Land Register data, which excludes lakes, ponds, glaciers > 1 km^{2} (0.386 sq mi or 247 acres) and river estuaries.

Marly-sur-Arroux (French pronunciation: [maʁli syʁ aʁu], literally Marly on Arroux) is a commune in the Saône-et-Loire department in the region of Bourgogne-Franche-Comté in eastern France.

== See also ==
- Communes of the Saône-et-Loire department
