= Vendenesse-sur-Arroux =

- Commune
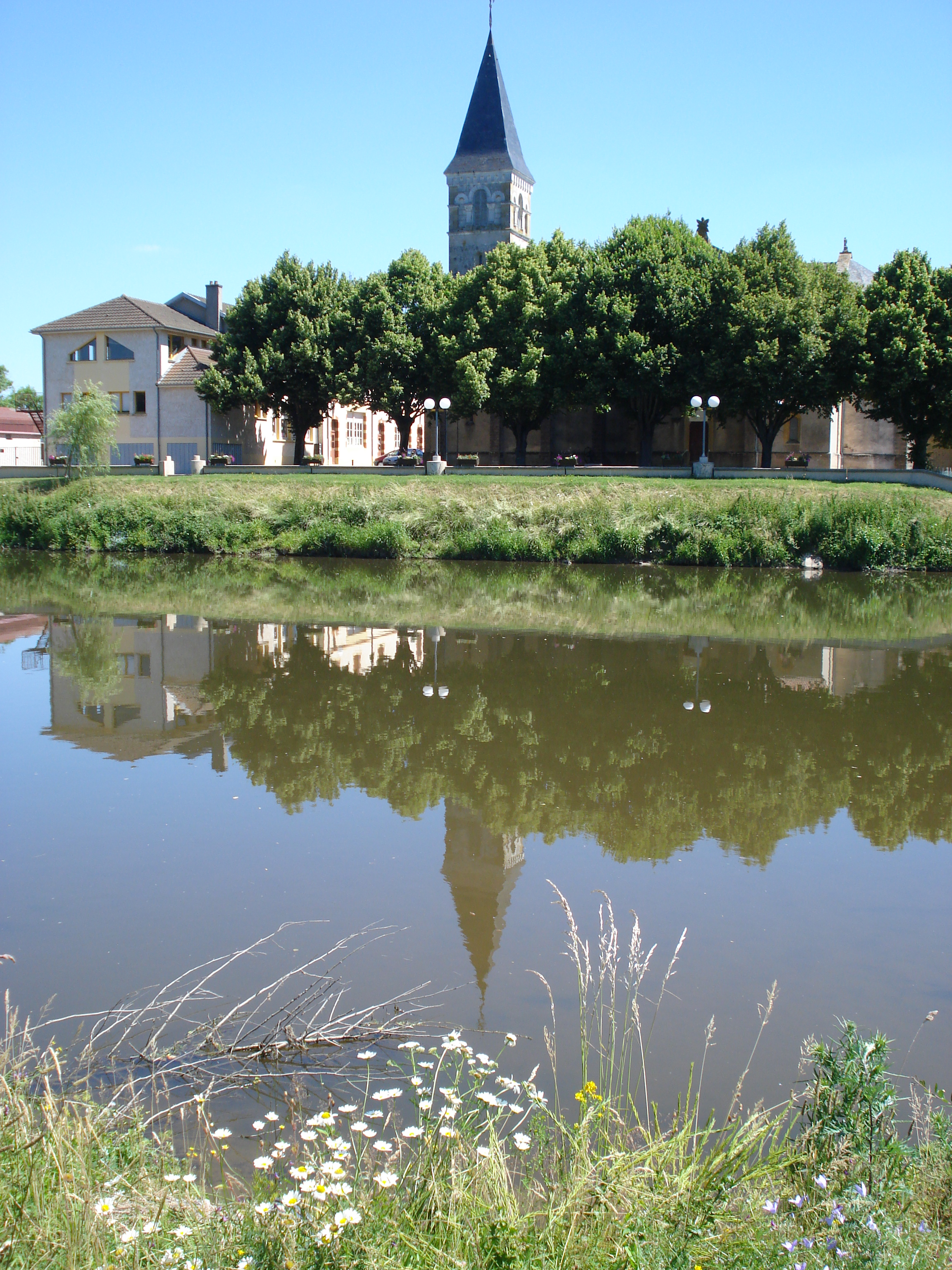
- The Arroux river and church in Vendenesse-sur-Arroux
- Location of Vendenesse-sur-Arroux
- Location within France Location within Bourgogne-Franche-Comté
- Coordinates: 46°37′43″N 4°03′59″E
- Country: France
- Region: Bourgogne-Franche-Comté
- Department: Saône-et-Loire
- Arrondissement: Charolles
- Canton: Gueugnon

Government
  - Mayor (2020–2026): Christian Simonin
- Area^{1}: 16.09 km^{2} (6.21 sq mi)
- Elevation: 248 m (814 ft)
- Highest elevation: 352 m (1,155 ft)
- Lowest elevation: 243 m (797 ft)
- Population (2023): 552
  - Density: 34.3/km^{2} (88.9/sq mi)
- Time zone: UTC+01:00 (CET)
  - Summer (DST): UTC+02:00 (CEST)
- INSEE/Postal code: 71565 /71130
- ^{1} French Land Register data, which excludes lakes, ponds, glaciers > 1 km^{2} (0.386 sq mi or 247 acres) and river estuaries.

Vendenesse-sur-Arroux (French pronunciation: [vɑ̃dnɛs syʁ aʁu], literally Vendenesse on Arroux) is a commune in the Saône-et-Loire department in the region of Bourgogne-Franche-Comté in eastern France.

== See also ==
- Communes of the Saône-et-Loire department
