= Marly-sous-Issy =

- Commune
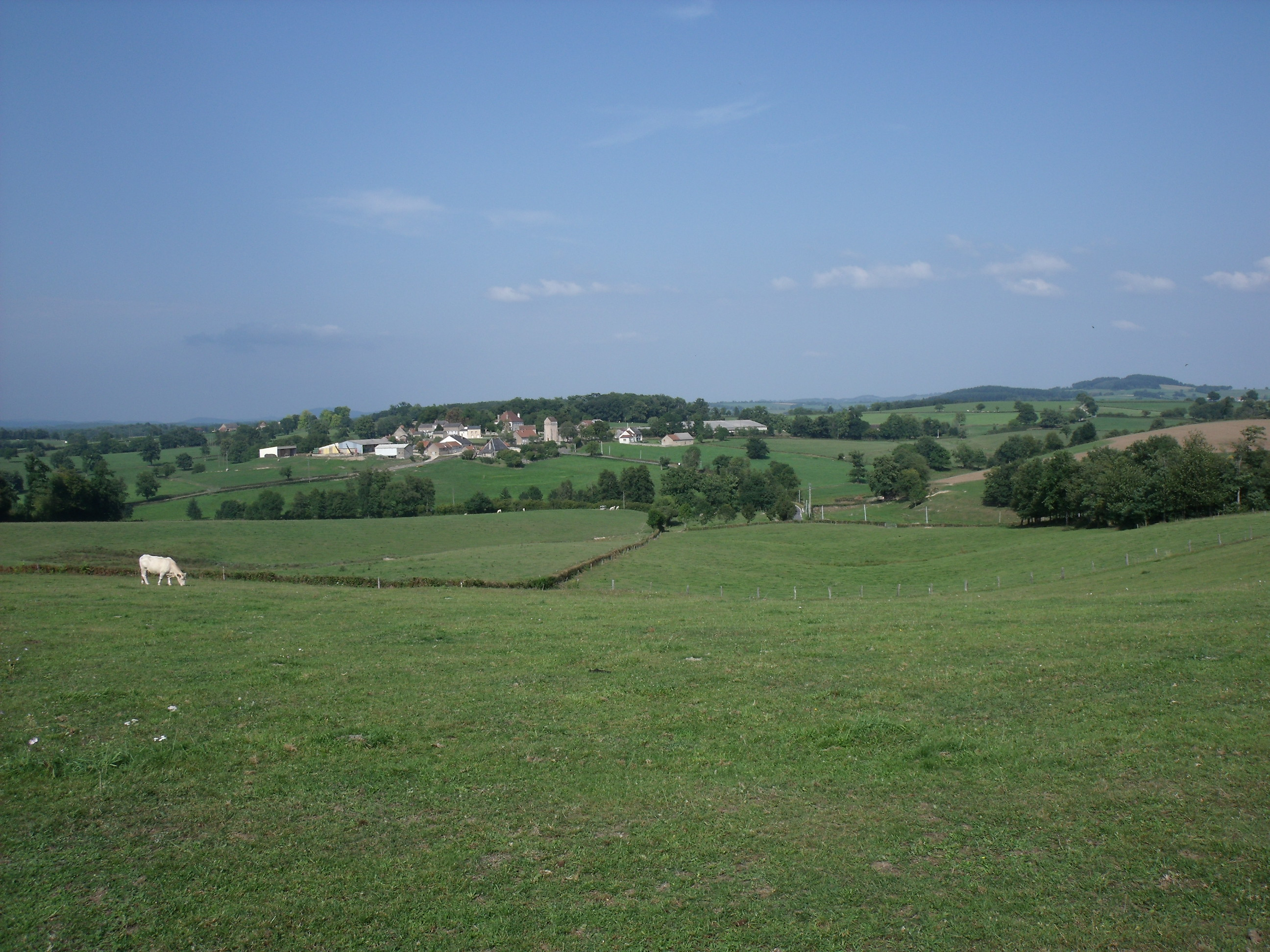
- A general view of Marly-sous-Issy
- Location of Marly-sous-Issy
- Location within France Location within Bourgogne-Franche-Comté
- Coordinates: 46°43′00″N 3°56′00″E
- Country: France
- Region: Bourgogne-Franche-Comté
- Department: Saône-et-Loire
- Arrondissement: Charolles
- Canton: Gueugnon

Government
  - Mayor (2020–2026): Bruno Pouchelet
- Area^{1}: 21.42 km^{2} (8.27 sq mi)
- Elevation: 320 m (1,050 ft)
- Highest elevation: 412 m (1,352 ft)
- Lowest elevation: 265 m (869 ft)
- Population (2023): 80
  - Density: 3.7/km^{2} (9.7/sq mi)
- Time zone: UTC+01:00 (CET)
  - Summer (DST): UTC+02:00 (CEST)
- INSEE/Postal code: 71280 /71760
- ^{1} French Land Register data, which excludes lakes, ponds, glaciers > 1 km^{2} (0.386 sq mi or 247 acres) and river estuaries.

Marly-sous-Issy (French pronunciation: [maʁli suz‿isi], literally Marly under Issy) is a commune in the Saône-et-Loire department in the region of Bourgogne-Franche-Comté in eastern France. The art historian Étienne Michon (1865–1939) was born in Marly-sous-Issy.

== See also ==
- Communes of the Saône-et-Loire department
