= Quadcross of Nations =

Quadcross of Nations
Series short	QXoN
Organisers	FIM
Location	various
Frequency	annual
Date	September/October
Type	ATV Motocross Race
History (QXoEN)
First edition	2009
Number of editions	16
Most wins	United States (5)
Most podiums	Netherlands (10)
Latest winner	Netherlands (2025)
History (QXoN)
First edition	2024
Number of editions	3
Most wins	United States (2)
Latest winner	United States (2026)

Quadcross of Nations (QXoN) is a single ATV event organized by FIM at the end of the year. The event features teams of three riders representing their nations. Each competition includes three motos, with two riders from each nation competing in every moto. The location of the event changes from year to year.

== History ==
The event began in 2009, originally limited to European nations. In 2017, the competition expanded to include countries outside Europe, such as the USA, Argentina, and Australia. Canada participated for the first time in 2018.

Up until 2024, the event was officially known as the Quadcross of European Nations (QXoEN) and was organized by FIM Europe. Due to growing international interest, FIM President Jorge Viegas announced that, beginning in 2024, the Quadcross of European Nations would continue as a separate European Championship, while the Quadcross of Nations would become an international event, open to teams from around the world. Viegas added:

"Following the success of the Sidecarcross and Quadcross of European Nations and the interest from international teams to take part in the Quad class in recent editions, the FIM and FIM Europe have agreed that the European Championships will be elevated to the FIM level as of 2024. We also hope to welcome a FIM Quadcross World Championship in the near future."

== Summary ==
Year	Location	Winning team	Winning riders	Ref(s)
2009	(Germany) Jauer	France	Romain Couprie / Matthieu Ternynck / Adrian Mangieu	
2010	(Slovakia) Sverepec	Italy	Nicola Montalbini / Emanuelle Giovanelli / Mattia Torraco	
2011	(Germany) Jauer	Belgium	Davy De Cuyper / Nikky Vaes / Jan Vlaeymans	
2012	(Netherlands) Oss	France	Romain Couprie / Matthieu Ternynck / Jeremie Warnia	
2013	(Italy) Cingoli	Event canceled		
2014	(Netherlands) Markelo	Netherlands	Mike van Grinsven / Joe Maessen / Ingo ten Vregelaar	
2015	(Germany) Schwedt	Netherlands	Mike van Grinsven / Joe Maessen / Ingo ten Vregelaar	
2016	(France) Sainte-Radegonde	France	Yoann Gillouin / Antoine Cheurlin / Adrien Mangieu	
2017	(Italy) Cingoli	United States	Chad Wienen / Joel Hetrick / Thomas Brown	
2018	(Denmark) Slagelse	United States	Chad Wienen / Jeffrey Rastrelli / Thomas Brown	
2019	(Germany) Schwedt	United States	Chad Wienen / Joel Hetrick / Thomas Brown	
2020	(Netherlands) Varsseveld	Event canceled		
2021	(France) Sainte-Radegonde	Ireland	Mark Mclernon / Justin Reid / Dean Dillon	
2022	(Czech Republic) Kramolín	United States	Chad Wienen / Joel Hetrick / Bryce Ford	
2023	(Italy) Cingoli	United States	Chad Wienen / Joel Hetrick / Bryce Ford	
2024	(Czech Republic) Loket	United States	Joel Hetrick / Bryce Ford / Brandon Hoag	
2025	(Netherlands) Heerde	Netherlands	Mike van Grinsven / Mike Verboven / Julian Veldman	
2026	(France) Sainte-Radegonde	United States	Max Lindquist / Joel Hetrick / Zack Decker	

== Event winners by team ==
Team	Total	Ref(s)
United States	7	
France	3	
Netherlands	3	
Ireland	1	
Italy	1	
Belgium	1	

== Event podium finishers by team ==
Year	Gold	Silver	Bronze	Ref(s)
2009	France	Portugal	Netherlands	
2010	Italy	Netherlands	Belgium	
2011	Belgium	Germany	Netherlands	
2012	France	United Kingdom	Belgium	
2013	Event canceled			
2014	Netherlands	France	United Kingdom	
2015	Netherlands	Latvia	Germany	
2016	France	Netherlands	Estonia	
2017	United States	France	Ireland	
2018	United States	Ireland	Netherlands	
2019	United States	Netherlands	Ireland	
2020	Event canceled			
2021	Ireland	Italy	Denmark	
2022	United States	Ireland	France	
2023	United States	Italy	Argentina	
2024	United States	Netherlands	Italy	
2025	Netherlands	United States	Estonia	
2026	United States	Norway	France	
