= La Chapelle-au-Mans =

- Commune
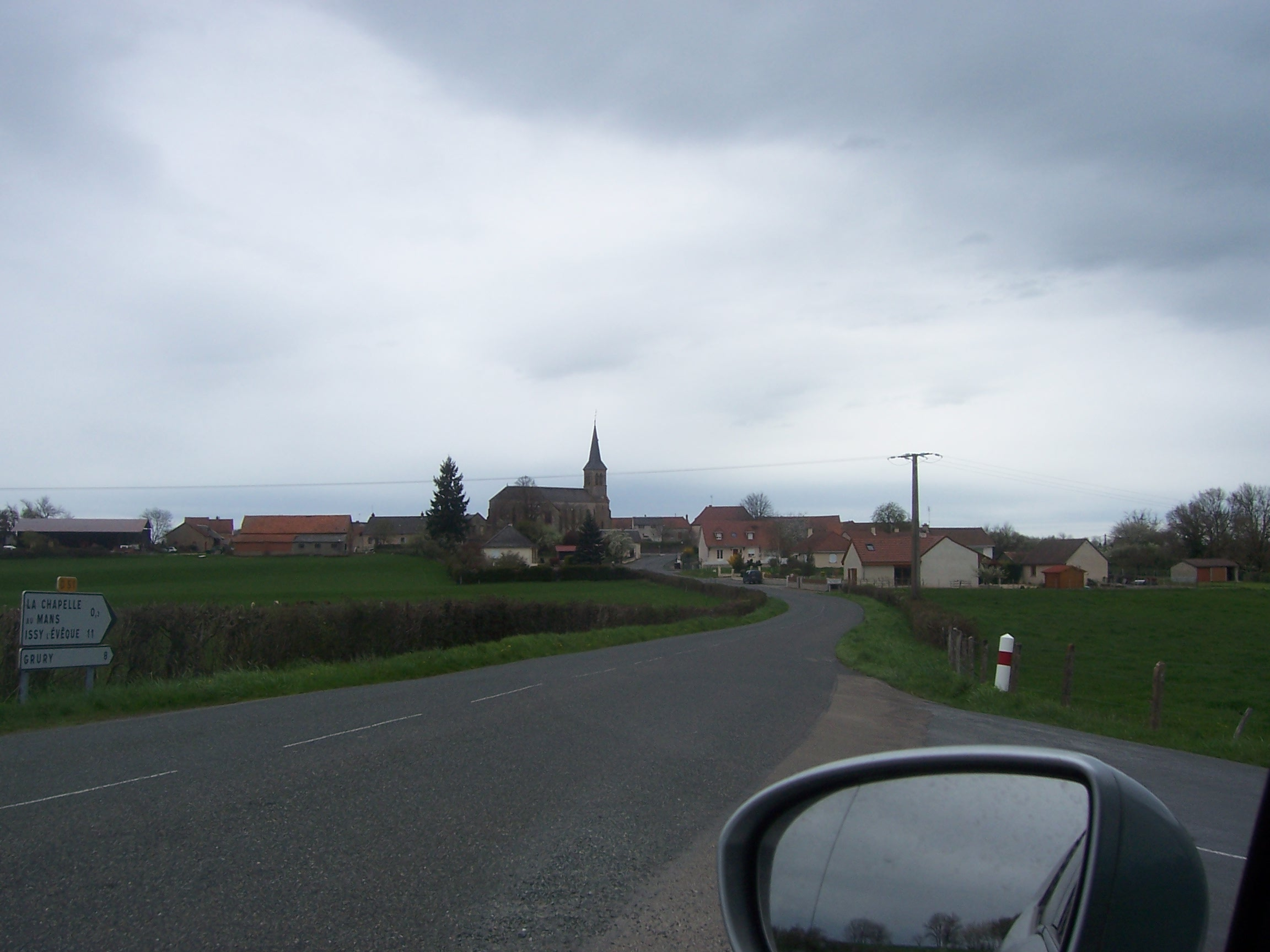
- A general view of La Chapelle-au-Mans
- Location of La Chapelle-au-Mans
- Location within France Location within Bourgogne-Franche-Comté
- Coordinates: 46°37′38″N 3°58′22″E
- Country: France
- Region: Bourgogne-Franche-Comté
- Department: Saône-et-Loire
- Arrondissement: Charolles
- Canton: Gueugnon
- Intercommunality: Entre Arroux, Loire et Somme

Government
  - Mayor (2020–2026): Armelle Devillard
- Area^{1}: 27.5 km^{2} (10.6 sq mi)
- Elevation: 374 m (1,227 ft)
- Highest elevation: 401 m (1,316 ft)
- Lowest elevation: 255 m (837 ft)
- Population (2023): 229
  - Density: 8.33/km^{2} (21.6/sq mi)
- Time zone: UTC+01:00 (CET)
  - Summer (DST): UTC+02:00 (CEST)
- INSEE/Postal code: 71088 /71130
- ^{1} French Land Register data, which excludes lakes, ponds, glaciers > 1 km^{2} (0.386 sq mi or 247 acres) and river estuaries.

La Chapelle-au-Mans (French pronunciation: [la ʃapɛl o mɑ̃]) is a commune in the Saône-et-Loire department in the region of Bourgogne-Franche-Comté in eastern France.

== See also ==
- Communes of the Saône-et-Loire department
