= Cuzy =

- Commune
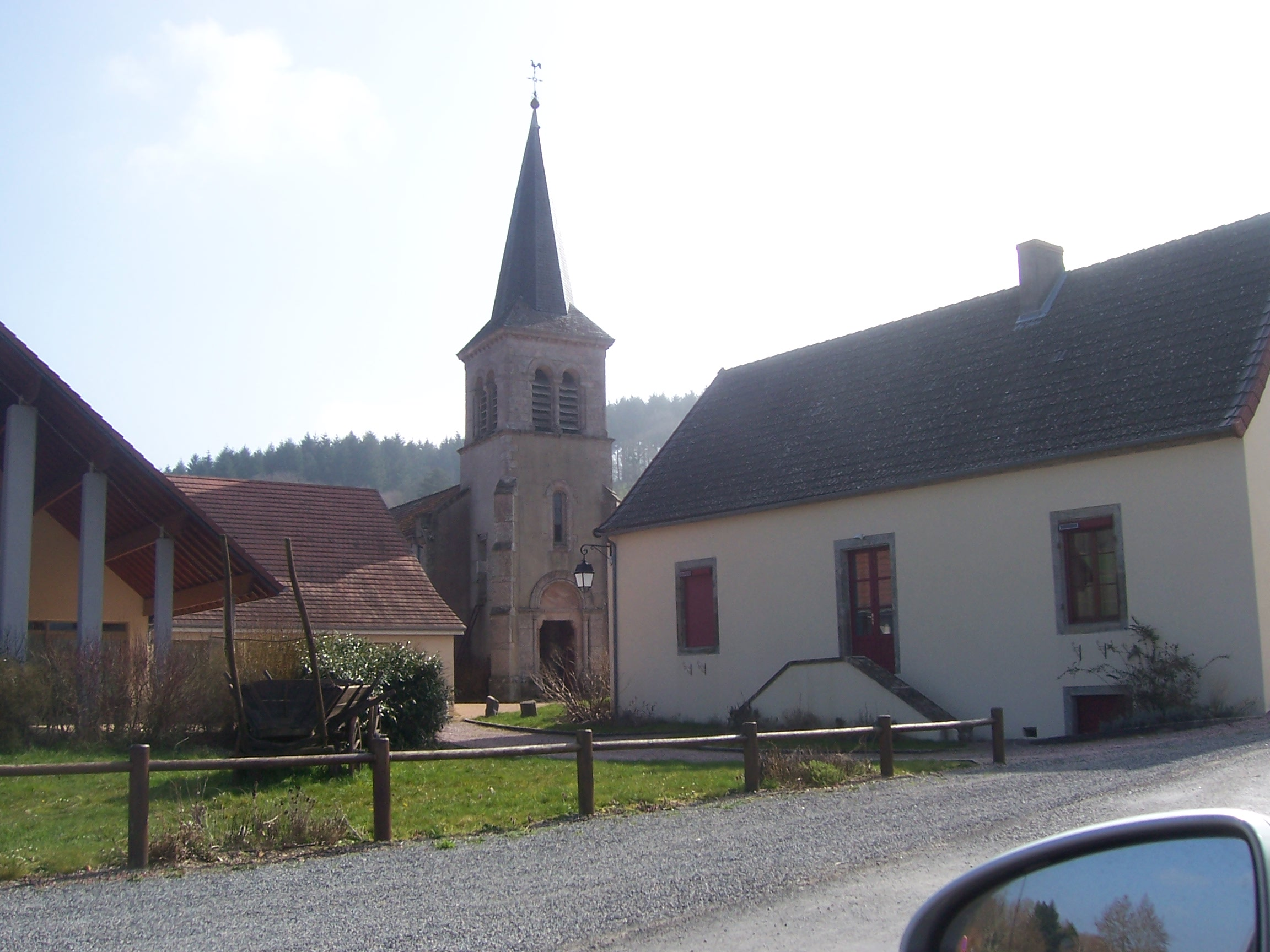
- The church in Cuzy

- Coat of arms
- Location of Cuzy
- Location within France Location within Bourgogne-Franche-Comté
- Coordinates: 46°46′00″N 4°02′00″E
- Country: France
- Region: Bourgogne-Franche-Comté
- Department: Saône-et-Loire
- Arrondissement: Charolles
- Canton: Gueugnon

Government
  - Mayor (2020–2026): Edith Perraudin
- Area^{1}: 17.91 km^{2} (6.92 sq mi)
- Elevation: 291 m (955 ft)
- Highest elevation: 455 m (1,493 ft)
- Lowest elevation: 269 m (883 ft)
- Population (2023): 110
  - Density: 6.1/km^{2} (16/sq mi)
- Time zone: UTC+01:00 (CET)
  - Summer (DST): UTC+02:00 (CEST)
- INSEE/Postal code: 71166 /71320
- ^{1} French Land Register data, which excludes lakes, ponds, glaciers > 1 km^{2} (0.386 sq mi or 247 acres) and river estuaries.

Cuzy (French pronunciation: [kyzi]) is a commune in the Saône-et-Loire department in the region of Bourgogne-Franche-Comté in eastern France.

== See also ==
- Communes of the Saône-et-Loire department
