= Ternin =

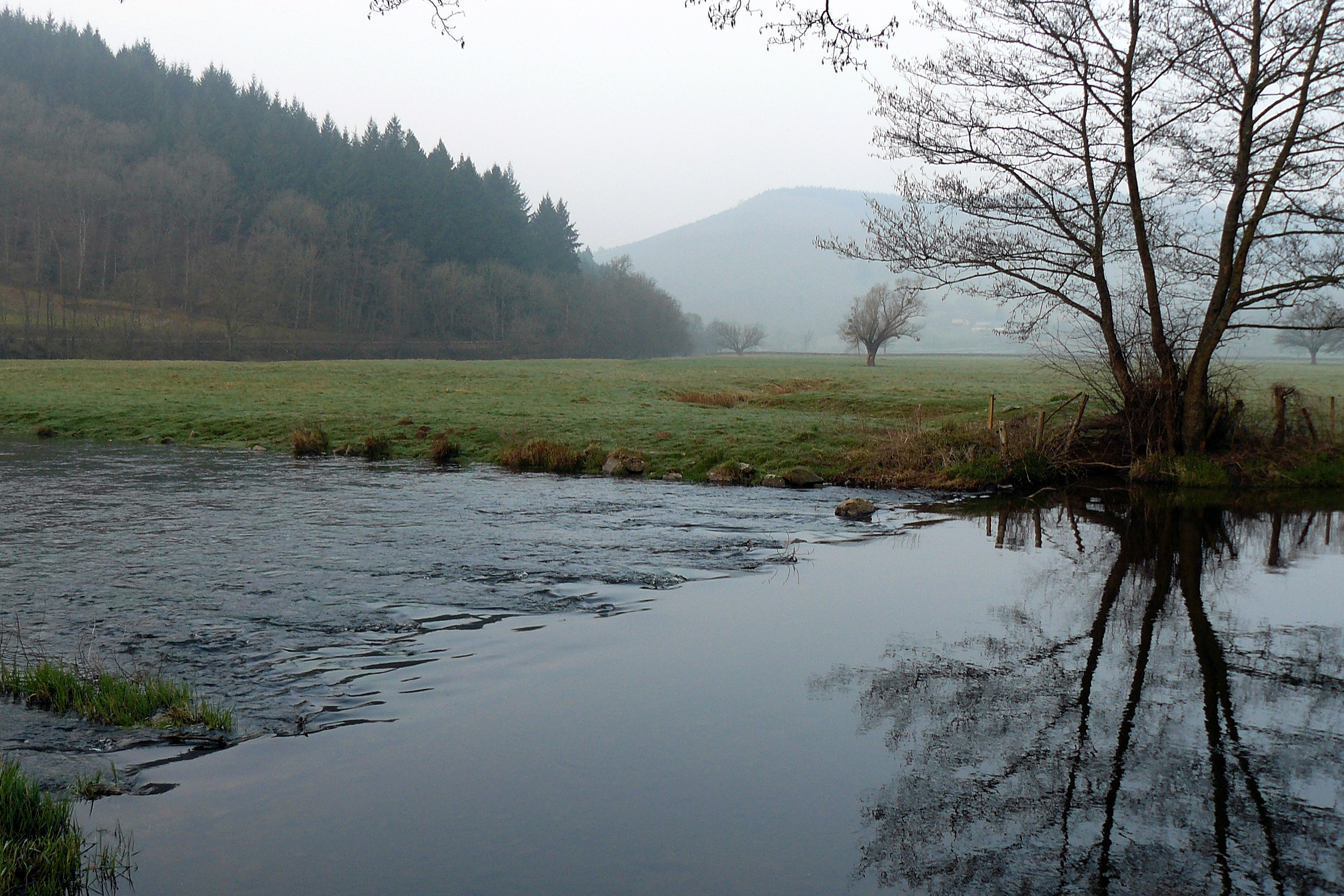
- The Ternin near Lucenay-l'Évêque

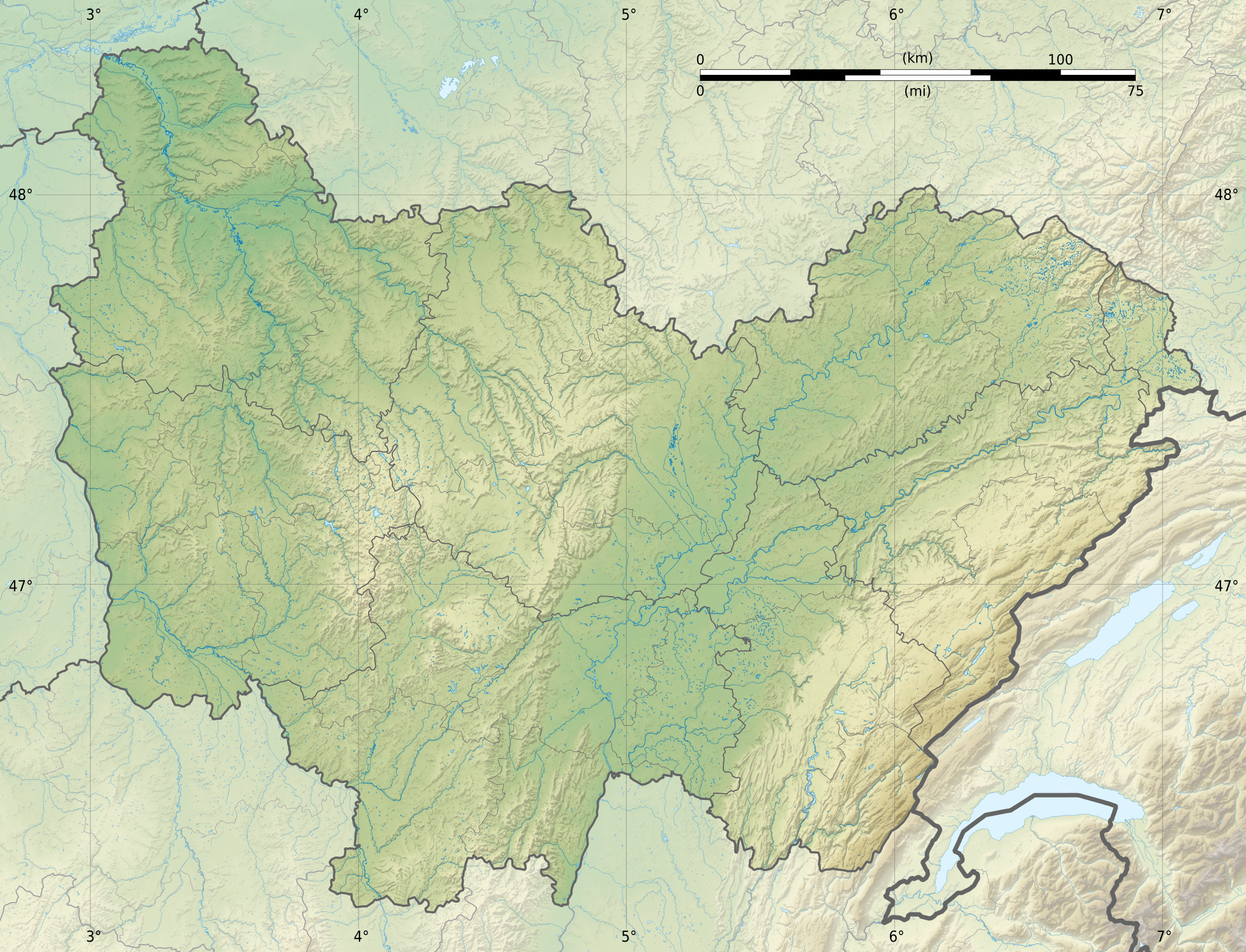
- Location within France Location within Bourgogne-Franche-Comté

Location
- Country: France

Physical characteristics
- Source
  - location: near Saulieu, Burgundy
  - coordinates: 47.2748°N 4.2069°E
- Mouth
  - location: Arroux in Autun
  - coordinates: 46.9604°N 4.2937°E
- Length: 48 km (30 mi)
- Basin size: 257 km^{2} (99 sq mi)

Basin features
- Progression: Arroux→ Loire→ Atlantic Ocean

The Ternin is a river in Burgundy, France, a right tributary of the Arroux, which is a tributary of the Loire. The length is 48 km, and its drainage basin is 257 km^{2}. The source of the Ternin is near Saulieu, in the Morvan hills. It flows south through the villages Alligny-en-Morvan, Lucenay-l'Évêque and Tavernay, and joins the Arroux in Autun.
