= Cressy-sur-Somme =

- Commune
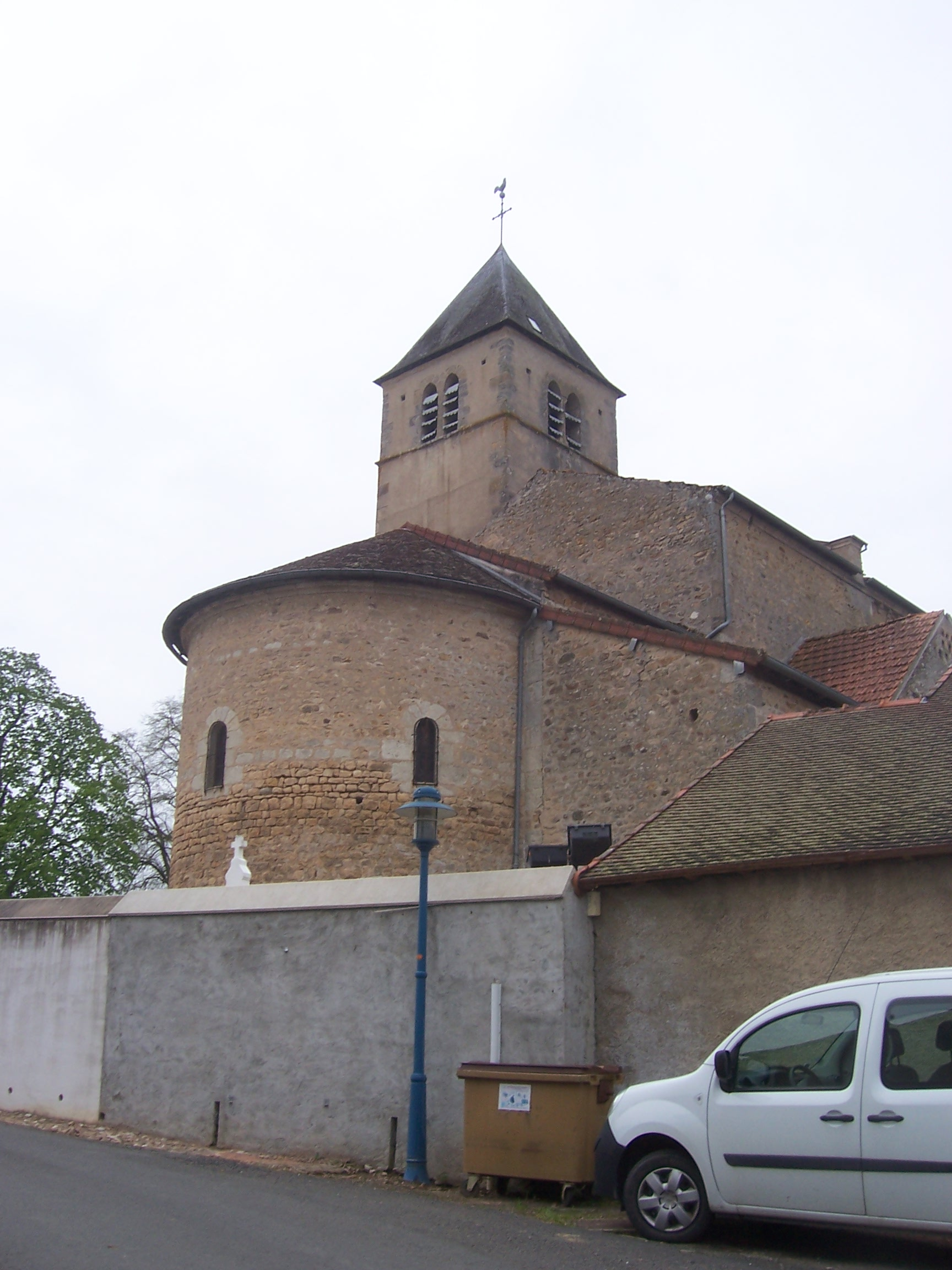
- The church in Cressy-sur-Somme

- Coat of arms
- Location of Cressy-sur-Somme
- Location within France Location within Bourgogne-Franche-Comté
- Coordinates: 46°42′00″N 3°52′00″E
- Country: France
- Region: Bourgogne-Franche-Comté
- Department: Saône-et-Loire
- Arrondissement: Charolles
- Canton: Gueugnon
- Intercommunality: Entre Arroux, Loire et Somme

Government
  - Mayor (2020–2026): Jean-Pierre Raulo
- Area^{1}: 28.13 km^{2} (10.86 sq mi)
- Elevation: 294 m (965 ft)
- Highest elevation: 392 m (1,286 ft)
- Lowest elevation: 232 m (761 ft)
- Population (2023): 175
  - Density: 6.22/km^{2} (16.1/sq mi)
- Time zone: UTC+01:00 (CET)
  - Summer (DST): UTC+02:00 (CEST)
- INSEE/Postal code: 71152 /71760
- ^{1} French Land Register data, which excludes lakes, ponds, glaciers > 1 km^{2} (0.386 sq mi or 247 acres) and river estuaries.

Cressy-sur-Somme (French pronunciation: [kʁesi syʁ sɔm], literally Cressy on Somme) is a commune in the Saône-et-Loire department in the region of Bourgogne-Franche-Comté in eastern France.

== See also ==
- Communes of the Saône-et-Loire department
