= Saint-Romain-sous-Versigny =

- Commune
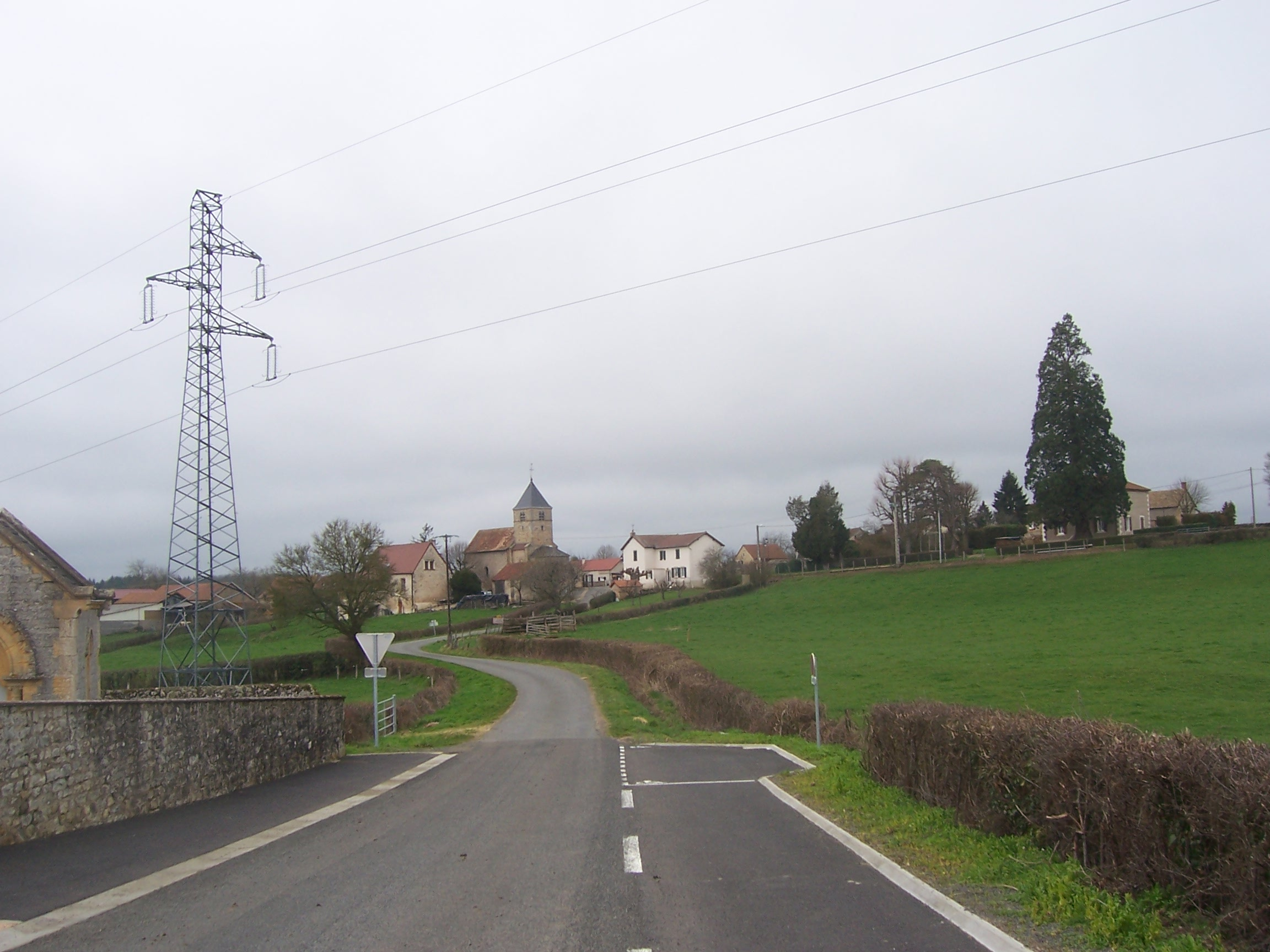
- A general view of Saint-Romain-sous-Versigny
- Location of Saint-Romain-sous-Versigny
- Location within France Location within Bourgogne-Franche-Comté
- Coordinates: 46°38′55″N 4°11′14″E
- Country: France
- Region: Bourgogne-Franche-Comté
- Department: Saône-et-Loire
- Arrondissement: Charolles
- Canton: Gueugnon
- Area^{1}: 17.73 km^{2} (6.85 sq mi)
- Highest elevation: 374 m (1,227 ft)
- Lowest elevation: 275 m (902 ft)
- Population (2023): 77
  - Density: 4.3/km^{2} (11/sq mi)
- Time zone: UTC+01:00 (CET)
  - Summer (DST): UTC+02:00 (CEST)
- INSEE/Postal code: 71478 /71420
- ^{1} French Land Register data, which excludes lakes, ponds, glaciers > 1 km^{2} (0.386 sq mi or 247 acres) and river estuaries.

Saint-Romain-sous-Versigny (French pronunciation: [sɛ̃ ʁɔmɛ̃ su vɛʁsiɲi]) is a commune in the Saône-et-Loire department in the region of Bourgogne-Franche-Comté in eastern France.

== See also ==
- Communes of the Saône-et-Loire department
