= Chassy, Saône-et-Loire =

Chassy
- Commune
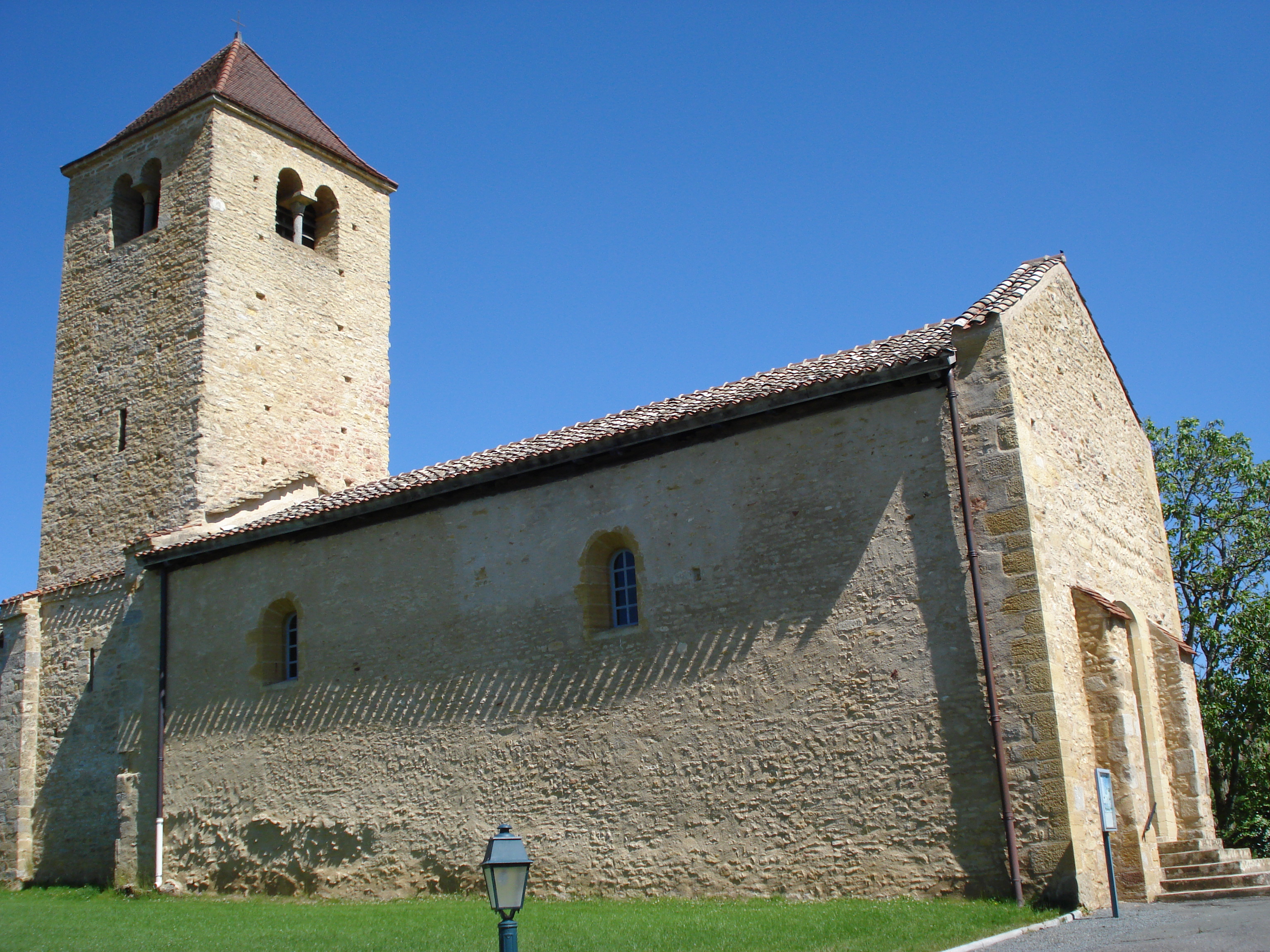
- The church in Chassy

- Coat of arms
- Location of Chassy
- Location within France Location within Bourgogne-Franche-Comté
- Coordinates: 46°35′18″N 4°06′49″E
- Country: France
- Region: Bourgogne-Franche-Comté
- Department: Saône-et-Loire
- Arrondissement: Charolles
- Canton: Gueugnon
- Intercommunality: Entre Arroux, Loire et Somme

Government
  - Mayor (2020–2026): Simone Bonacchi
- Area^{1}: 13.43 km^{2} (5.19 sq mi)
- Elevation: 312 m (1,024 ft)
- Highest elevation: 360 m (1,180 ft)
- Lowest elevation: 258 m (846 ft)
- Population (2023): 296
  - Density: 22.0/km^{2} (57.1/sq mi)
- Time zone: UTC+01:00 (CET)
  - Summer (DST): UTC+02:00 (CEST)
- INSEE/Postal code: 71111 /71130
- ^{1} French Land Register data, which excludes lakes, ponds, glaciers > 1 km^{2} (0.386 sq mi or 247 acres) and river estuaries.

Chassy (French pronunciation: [ʃasi]) is a commune in the Saône-et-Loire department in the region of Bourgogne-Franche-Comté in eastern France.

== History ==
It is in April, 1164, that Pope Alexandre III, taken refuge in France, gives a bull to the Abbey of Saint-Martin d'Autun, confirming the patronage of the church to the advantage of this abbey:" Ecclesiam de Chariaco ".

== Liste of Mayor ==
- 1996-2008 : Jeanne Berlaud
- Since 2008 : Simone Bonachi-Vezant

== See also ==
- Communes of the Saône-et-Loire department
