= Montmort =

- Commune
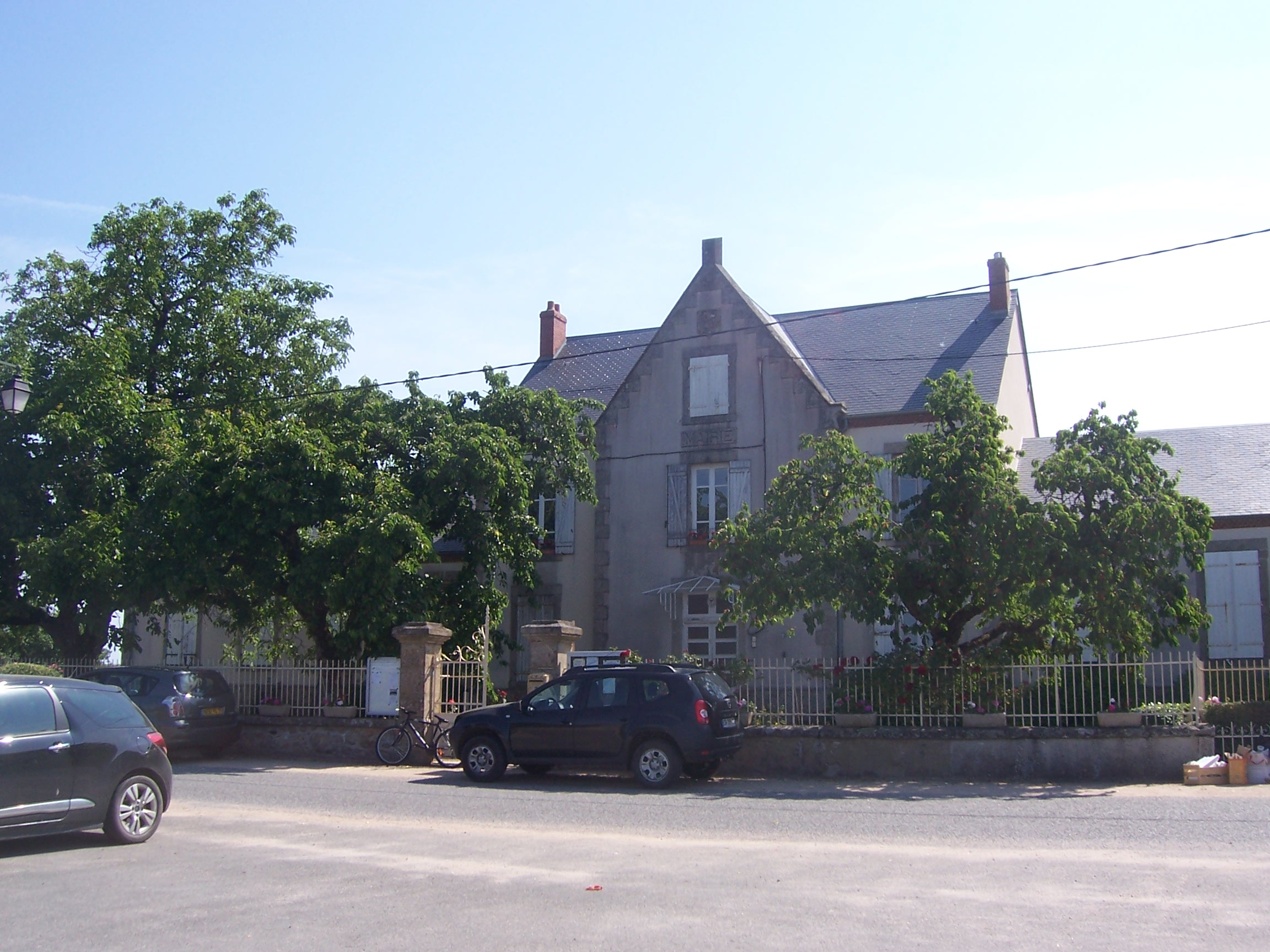
- The town hall in Montmort

- Coat of arms
- Location of Montmort
- Location within France Location within Bourgogne-Franche-Comté
- Coordinates: 46°44′00″N 4°05′00″E
- Country: France
- Region: Bourgogne-Franche-Comté
- Department: Saône-et-Loire
- Arrondissement: Charolles
- Canton: Gueugnon

Government
  - Mayor (2020–2026): Bernard Dufraigne
- Area^{1}: 31.73 km^{2} (12.25 sq mi)
- Elevation: 350 m (1,150 ft)
- Highest elevation: 486 m (1,594 ft)
- Lowest elevation: 248 m (814 ft)
- Population (2023): 185
  - Density: 5.83/km^{2} (15.1/sq mi)
- Time zone: UTC+01:00 (CET)
  - Summer (DST): UTC+02:00 (CEST)
- INSEE/Postal code: 71317 /71320
- ^{1} French Land Register data, which excludes lakes, ponds, glaciers > 1 km^{2} (0.386 sq mi or 247 acres) and river estuaries.

Montmort (French pronunciation: [mɔ̃mɔʁ]) is a commune in the Saône-et-Loire department in the region of Bourgogne-Franche-Comté in eastern France. It has a Romanesque church from the 11th century.

== See also ==
- Communes of the Saône-et-Loire department
- Pierre Raymond de Montmort, a French mathematician
