= Canton of Gueugnon =

Coordinates: 46.60°N 4.07°E

The canton of Gueugnon is an administrative division of the Saône-et-Loire department, eastern France. Its borders were modified at the French canton reorganisation which came into effect in March 2015. Its seat is in Gueugnon.

It consists of the following communes:

1. La Chapelle-au-Mans
2. Chassy
3. Clessy
4. Cressy-sur-Somme
5. Curdin
6. Cuzy
7. Dompierre-sous-Sanvignes
8. Grury
9. Gueugnon
10. Issy-l'Évêque
11. Marly-sous-Issy
12. Marly-sur-Arroux
13. Montmort
14. Neuvy-Grandchamp
15. Rigny-sur-Arroux
16. Sainte-Radegonde
17. Saint-Romain-sous-Versigny
18. Toulon-sur-Arroux
19. Uxeau
20. Vendenesse-sur-Arroux
