= Étienne Michon =

French art historian (1865–1939)

- Born: 23 March 1865; Marly-sous-Issy
- Died: 2 January 1939 (aged 73)
- Education: École normale supérieure
- Occupation: art historian
- Known for: curator at the Louvre
- Father: fr:Joseph Michon

Étienne-Louis-Charles-Alexandre Michon (23 March 1865 in Marly-sous-Issy – 2 January 1939) was a French art historian.

== Biography ==
The son of fr:Joseph Michon, Étienne Michon was a student at the École normale supérieure from 1884 to 1886 and agrégé de lettres. He was a member of the École française de Rome from 1887 to 1889, and worked at the Louvre from 1889 to 1899.

Étienne Michon was assistant curator at the Louvre from 1899 to 1919, professor at the École du Louvre from 1910 to 1931, chief curator at the Louvre from 1919 to 1936, co-director of the magazine Monuments et mémoires de la fondation Eugène Piot from 1929 to 1939 and honorary curator of national museums in 1936.

He became a member of the Société des Antiquaires de France in 1895 and was elected at the Académie des Inscriptions et Belles-Lettres in 1925.

He was officier of the Légion d'honneur, officier d'Académie and officier de l'Instruction publique.

== Some publications ==
- Musée du Louvre. Département des antiquités grecques et romaines. – Acquisitions de l'année 1906. Éd. Antoine Héron de Villefosse et Étienne Michon. Paris : s. n., 1907.
- Musée du Louvre. Département des antiquités grecques et romaines. – Catalogue sommaire des marbres antiques. Éd. Antoine Héron de Villefosse et Étienne Michon. Paris : s. n., 1896 ; Paris : G. Braun, 1918 ; Melun : imprimerie Administrative ; Paris : Musées nationaux, palais du Louvre, 1922.
- La Sculpture grecque au musée du Louvre. Paris : L'Illustration, 1934 (« Les Albums du Louvre »).
- La Sculpture romaine au musée du Louvre, Paris : L'Illustration, 1936 (« Les Albums du Louvre »).

== Sources ==
- Charles Picard, Éloge funèbre de M. Etienne Michon, membre ordinaire, 1939
