= Fédération Internationale de Motocyclisme =

International sport governing body

- FIM logo since 8 January 2024
- Sport: Motorcycle sport
- Jurisdiction: International
- Abbreviation: FIM
- Founded: 1904
- Headquarters: Mies, Switzerland
- President: Jorge Viegas

Official website
- www.fim-moto.com

The International Motorcycling Federation (Fédération Internationale de Motocyclisme, FIM for short) is the global governing/sanctioning body of motorcycle racing. It represents 123 national motorcycle federations, divided into six continental unions.

There are ten motorcycle-racing disciplines that FIM covers, encompassing over 90+ international championships as well as 188 secondary championships of circuit racing, enduro, speedway racing, trials, off-roading, motocross, supercross, snocross, sidecars, and e-bikes. FIM is also involved in many non-racing activities that promote the sport, its safety, and support relevant public policy. The FIM is also the first international sporting federation to publish an Environmental Code in 1994. In 2007, the FIM created a Commission for Women in Motorcycling to promote the use of powered two-wheelers and motorcycle sports among women.

== History ==
The FIM was born from the Fédération Internationale des Clubs Motocyclistes (FICM), which itself was founded in Paris, France, on 21 December 1904. The British Auto-Cycle Union was one of the founding members. In 1906, the FICM was dissolved but was reborn in 1912, with its headquarters now in England. The Six Days Reliability Trial was held the following year, the first international event of the new incarnation.

The name was changed to the Fédération Internationale Motocycliste (FIM) in 1949, the same year that also saw the first race of the famed Road Racing World Championship Grand Prix. The headquarters were transferred to Geneva, Switzerland in 1959.

In 1994, the headquarters was relocated, this time to Mies, Switzerland, and occupied its own building for the first time, shaped like a stylized motorcycle wheel. The FIM moved to a new headquarters next door in 2024, while the original premises were converted into the Racing Motorcycle Museum, which opened on 18 February 2026.

The name was changed again in 1998 to the Fédération Internationale de Motocyclisme at the congress in Cape Town, South Africa. The same year, the FIM was granted provisional recognition by the International Olympic Committee, and gained full status in 2000 at the 2000 Summer Olympics in Sydney, Australia.

2004 marked the organization's centenary, and celebrations were held at the congress in Paris in October. Since 2018, Jorge Viegas (Portugal) has been President of the FIM.

Due to the 2022 Russian invasion of Ukraine, on 6 March 2022, the FIM banned all Russian and Belarusian motorcycle riders, teams, officials, and competitions.

== FIM competitions ==
=== Circuit racing ===
International

- FIM Intercontinental Games

World Championships

- FIM MotoGP World Championship
- FIM Superbike World Championship
- FIM Women's Circuit Racing World Championship
- FIM Harley-Davidson Bagger World Cup
- FIM MotoE World Championship (not active, on hiatus)

Feeder Series

- FIM Moto2 World Championship
- FIM Moto3 World Championship
- FIM Moto3 Junior World Championship
- FIM MotoMini World Series (24 international series)
- FIM Supersport World Championship
- FIM Sportbike World Championship
- FIM Yamaha R3 BLU BRU World Cup
- Red Bull MotoGP Rookies Cup

International Cups and National Series

- Asia Road Racing Championships
- FIM Women's European Championship
- Moto2 European Championship
- Moto4 Asia Cup
- Moto4 British Cup
- Moto4 European Cup
- Moto4 Latin Cup
- Moto4 Northern Cup
- Stock European Championship

=== Endurance racing ===
- International Six Days Enduro
- FIM Endurance World Championship
- FIM Enduro Championship
- FIM Hard Enduro World Championship
- FIM SuperEnduro World Championship
- FIM S1GP Supermoto World Championship

=== Speedway Grand Prix ===
- FIM Speedway Grand Prix
- FIM Speedway World Cup
- FIM Speedway of Nations
- FIM Speedway Under-21 World Championship
- FIM Speedway of Nations Under 21
- FIM SGP3 World Championship
- FIM SGP4 World Championship
- FIM Women's Speedway World Cup
- FIM Women's Speedway Gold Trophy
- FIM Flat Track World Championship
- FIM Long Track World Championship
- FIM Long Track of Nations
- FIM Long Track under 23 World Cup
- FIM Track Racing Youth Gold Trophy
- FIM Track Racing Training Camp

=== Moto trials ===
- Bonneville Motorcycle Speed Trials AMA National and FIM World Records
- FIM Trial World Championship
- FIM X-Trial World Championship
- FIM Trial des Nations
- FIM X-Trial des Nations

=== Off-roading and freestyle ===
- FIM World Rally-Raid Championship
- FIM Bajas World Cup
- FIM FreeStyleCross World Cup
- FIM Hillclimb Racing Europe
- FIM Sand Races World Championship
- YZ BLU CRU FIM Europe Cup
- MotoCross
  - FIM Motocross World Championship
  - FIM Motocross des Nations
  - FIM Women's Motocross World Championship
  - FIM Motocross Junior World Championship
- SuperCross
  - FIM Supercross World Championship
  - FIM Supermoto of Nations
- SnowCross & Ice Speedway
  - FIM Ice Speedway World Championship
  - FIM Ice Speedway of Nations
  - FIM Snowcross World Championship
  - FIM Women's Snowcross World Championship

=== Sidecars and ATVs ===
- FIM Sidecar World Championship
- FIM Sidecarcross World Championship
- FIM SidecarCross of Nations
- FIM Quadcross of Nations (Intercontinental)

== Presidents ==
Fédération Internationale des Clubs Motocyclistes (FICM)
Term	President	Nationality
1904–1905	A. de Lahausse	France
1905–1906	Marquis de Mouzilly Saint-Mars	France
1912–1924	Arthur Stanley	United Kingdom
1924–1946	Alberto Bonacossa	Italy
1946–1947	Augustin Pérouse	France
1947–1949	Marcel Haecker	Switzerland
Fédération Internationale de Motocyclisme (FIM)
Term	President	Nationality
1949–1951	Marcel Haecker	Switzerland
1951–1959	Augustin Pérouse	France
1959–1965	Pieter Nortier	Netherlands
1965–1983	Nicolás Rodil del Valle	Spain
1983–1989	Nicolas Schmit	Luxembourg
1989–1995	Jos Vaessen	Netherlands
1995–2006	Francesco Zerbi	Italy
2006–2018	Vito Ippolito	Venezuela
2018–present	Jorge Viegas	Portugal

== FIM motorcycle racing helmet testing and homologation ==
In 2019, the FIM decided to implement its own helmet testing regime. Helmet manufacturers must submit helmets for testing, and the FIM then lab tests them to ensure they are up to the job of protecting racers.

== See also ==
- FIA
- Outline of motorcycles and motorcycling
- SHARP (helmet ratings)
