= Neuvy-Grandchamp =

- Commune
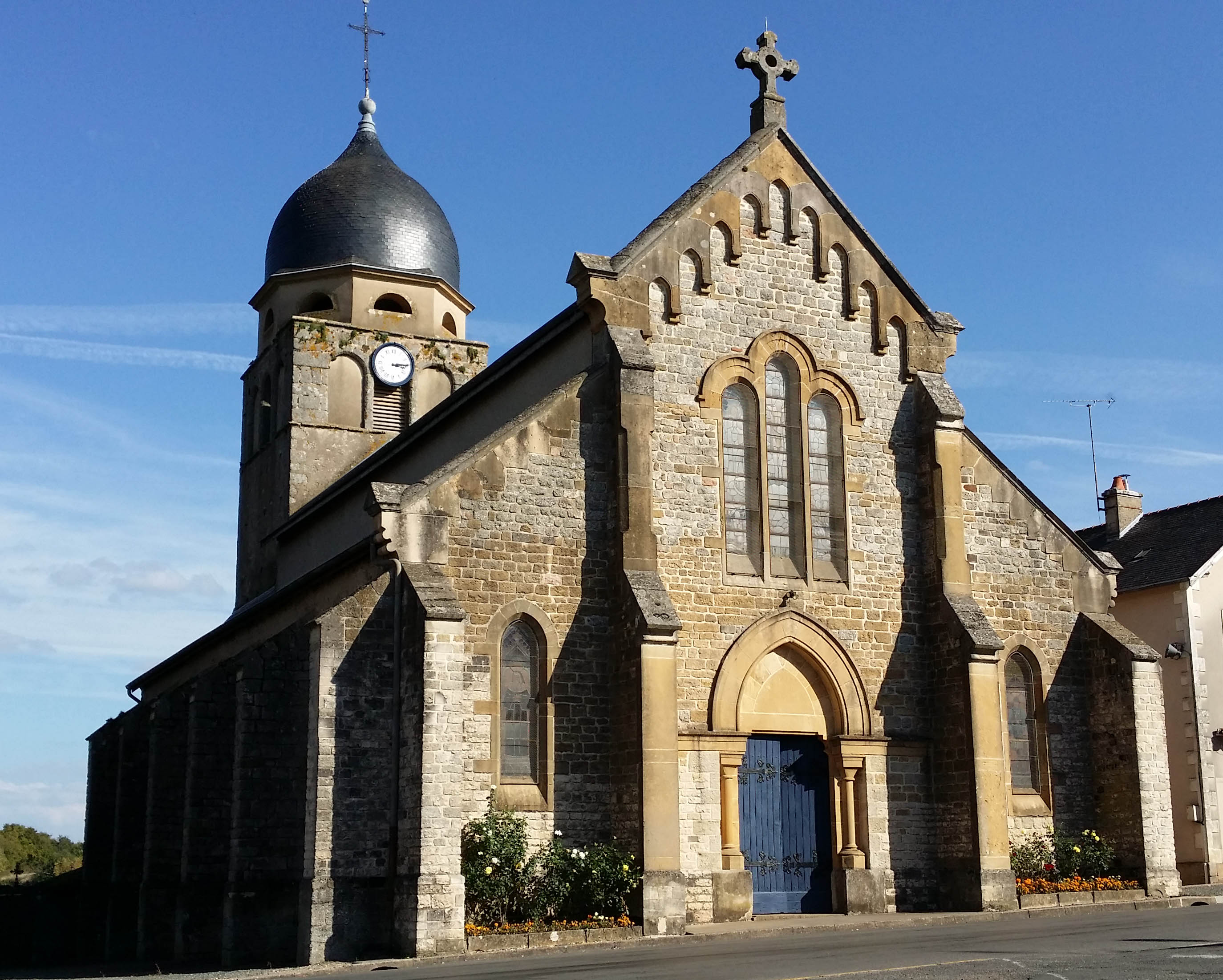
- The church in Neuvy-Grandchamp
- Location of Neuvy-Grandchamp
- Location within France Location within Bourgogne-Franche-Comté
- Coordinates: 46°35′25″N 3°56′01″E
- Country: France
- Region: Bourgogne-Franche-Comté
- Department: Saône-et-Loire
- Arrondissement: Charolles
- Canton: Gueugnon

Government
  - Mayor (2026–32): Christian Bonnerot
- Area^{1}: 49.64 km^{2} (19.17 sq mi)
- Elevation: 325 m (1,066 ft)
- Highest elevation: 397 m (1,302 ft)
- Lowest elevation: 264 m (866 ft)
- Population (2023): 752
  - Density: 15.1/km^{2} (39.2/sq mi)
- Time zone: UTC+01:00 (CET)
  - Summer (DST): UTC+02:00 (CEST)
- INSEE/Postal code: 71330 /71130
- ^{1} French Land Register data, which excludes lakes, ponds, glaciers > 1 km^{2} (0.386 sq mi or 247 acres) and river estuaries.

Neuvy-Grandchamp (French pronunciation: [nøvi ɡʁɑ̃ʃɑ̃]) is a commune in the Saône-et-Loire department in the region of Bourgogne-Franche-Comté in eastern France.

== Geography ==
Neuvy-Grandchamp is located 328 km (204 mi) to 159 km (99 mi) from Paris and Lyon. With its 4,964 ha (12,270 acres), the common of Neuvy Grandchamps is the largest municipality in Canton of Gueugnon. However, in 1869, the town was cut from 298 acres (121 ha) to contribute to the formation of the new common: Les Guerreaux. The hilly area of the town rises to 400 ft (120 m) and stretches for 10 km (6.2 mi) from north to south and 8 km (5.0 mi) from east to west.

== Toponymy ==
From "Novis Vicus" in the ninth century through "Noviacus" in the thirteenth century, "Niviz" or "Novovico" in the fourteenth century, "Neufvy" in the seventeenth century and finally "Neuvy" in the eighteenth century, the name thus refers to a village on the roadside.

== History ==
The formation of fiefs and the parish during the early Middle Ages is quite obscure. In the 14th century, the great fief of Vesvre occupied the northern half of the region. The rest, which seems to result from the fragmentation of another large rural domain, was divided into several lands from which the fief of Beauchamp emerged during the following centuries.

Nicolas Rolin owned the seigneury of Beauchamp but probably lived there little. This stronghold had the particularity of having an iron factory (as well as the mine which supplied it) near its castle, now disappeared. Sold as national property in 1799, they were bought in 1802 by Michel Ramus (founder of the Royal Foundry of Montcenis) who modernized and developed them, making this establishment one of the most competitive in the region. His death prevented him from creating an annex to Saint-Agnan. Acquired by the Count of Dormy, the factory quickly collapsed and definitively ceased operations in 1834. The mine was closed for lack of profitability towards the end of the 19th century, but reopened during the Second World War to serve as a refuge for STO refractories. The exploitation was definitively stopped in 1948.

Since 1891, a decree of the President of the Republic associates with the name of the town the place called Grandchamp, from the name of this coal exploitation.

During the Spanish Civil War, Neuvy-Grandchamp was one of the rare French rural municipalities to have received refugees. This particularity is due to the presence of a municipal executive on the left, then headed by the mayor SFIO, Pierre Boudot, borough councilor. The latter was therefore voluntary to accommodate refugees whose contingent arrived on 11 February 1939. This was made up of two extended families. One of 19 people came from Arbeca, in the province of Lleida, in Catalonia. The other, 23 people, came from Huesca, north of Zaragoza, in Aragon. All were cultivators

== Mayors ==
Mayor	Term
Lucien Journet	1971–2001
André Lacroix	2001–2014
Claude Ledey	2014–2026
Christian Bonnerot	2026–

== See also ==
- Communes of the Saône-et-Loire department
