= Curdin =

- Commune
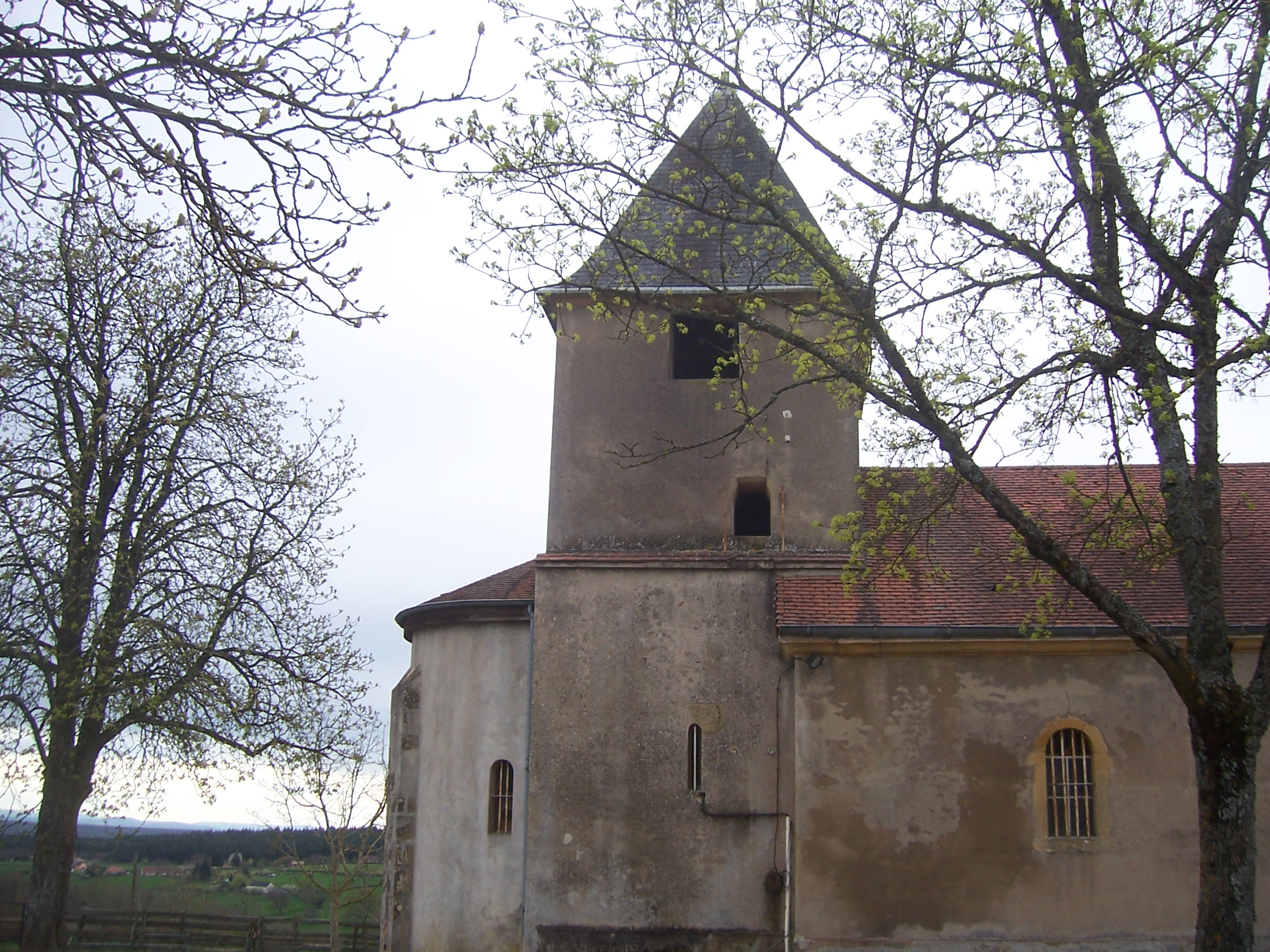
- The church in Curdin
- Location of Curdin
- Location within France Location within Bourgogne-Franche-Comté
- Coordinates: 46°35′45″N 3°59′48″E
- Country: France
- Region: Bourgogne-Franche-Comté
- Department: Saône-et-Loire
- Arrondissement: Charolles
- Canton: Gueugnon

Government
  - Mayor (2020–2026): Jean-Luc Forêt
- Area^{1}: 8 km^{2} (3.1 sq mi)
- Elevation: 350 m (1,150 ft)
- Highest elevation: 352 m (1,155 ft)
- Lowest elevation: 258 m (846 ft)
- Population (2023): 345
  - Density: 43/km^{2} (110/sq mi)
- Time zone: UTC+01:00 (CET)
  - Summer (DST): UTC+02:00 (CEST)
- INSEE/Postal code: 71161 /71130
- ^{1} French Land Register data, which excludes lakes, ponds, glaciers > 1 km^{2} (0.386 sq mi or 247 acres) and river estuaries.

Curdin (French pronunciation: [kyʁdɛ̃]) is a commune in the Saône-et-Loire department in the region of Bourgogne-Franche-Comté in eastern France.

== See also ==
- Communes of the Saône-et-Loire department
