= Clessy =

- Commune
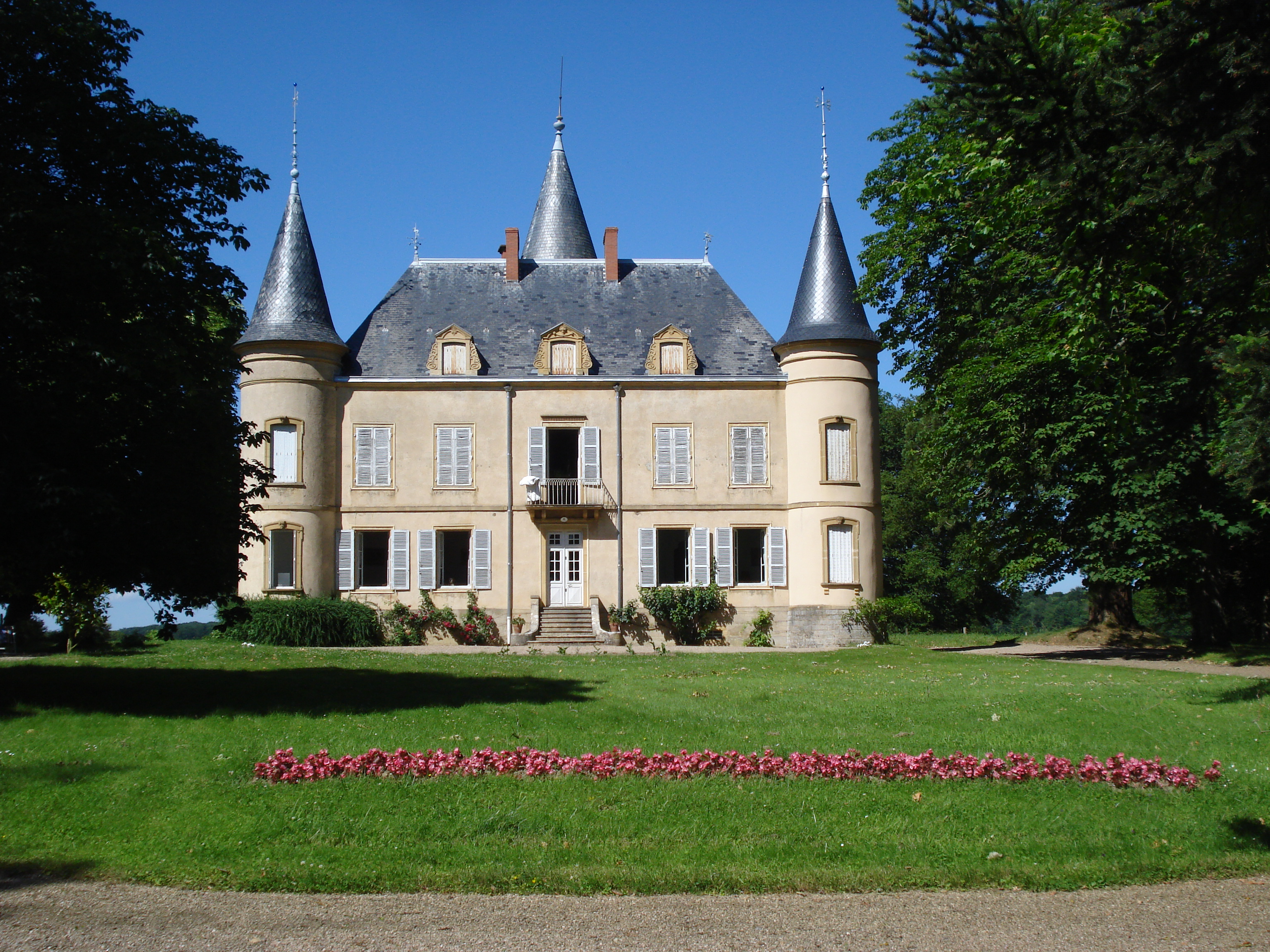
- Chateau
- Location of Clessy
- Location within France Location within Bourgogne-Franche-Comté
- Coordinates: 46°33′31″N 4°05′15″E
- Country: France
- Region: Bourgogne-Franche-Comté
- Department: Saône-et-Loire
- Arrondissement: Charolles
- Canton: Gueugnon

Government
  - Mayor (2020–2026): Philippe Desroches
- Area^{1}: 16.99 km^{2} (6.56 sq mi)
- Elevation: 310 m (1,020 ft)
- Highest elevation: 340 m (1,120 ft)
- Lowest elevation: 242 m (794 ft)
- Population (2023): 276
  - Density: 16.2/km^{2} (42.1/sq mi)
- Time zone: UTC+01:00 (CET)
  - Summer (DST): UTC+02:00 (CEST)
- INSEE/Postal code: 71136 /71130
- ^{1} French Land Register data, which excludes lakes, ponds, glaciers > 1 km^{2} (0.386 sq mi or 247 acres) and river estuaries.

Clessy (French pronunciation: [klesi]) is a commune in the Saône-et-Loire department in the region of Bourgogne-Franche-Comté in eastern France.

== See also ==
- Communes of the Saône-et-Loire department
