= Toulon-sur-Arroux =

- Commune
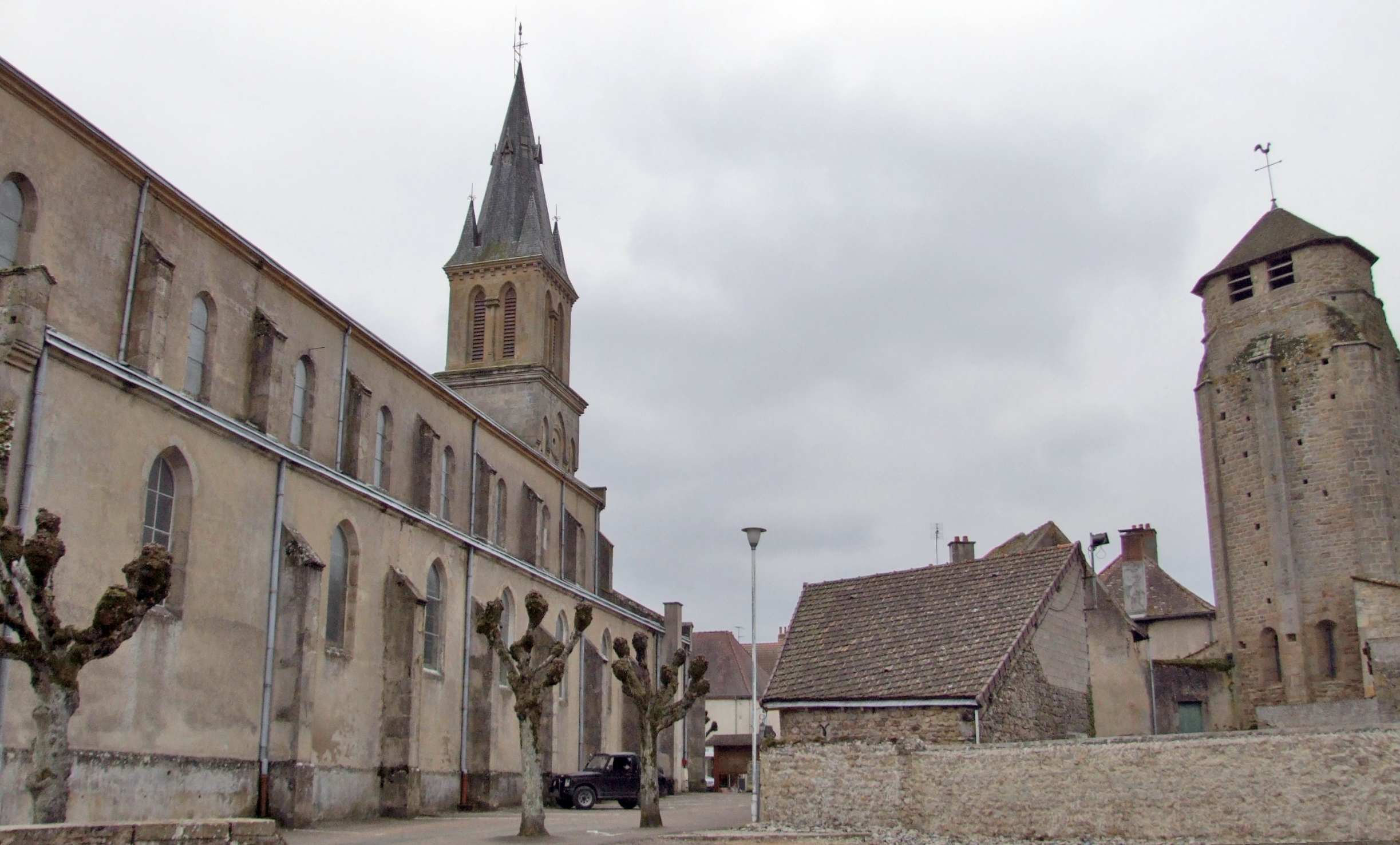
- The church in Toulon-sur-Arroux

- Coat of arms
- Location of Toulon-sur-Arroux
- Location within France Location within Bourgogne-Franche-Comté
- Coordinates: 46°41′38″N 4°08′19″E
- Country: France
- Region: Bourgogne-Franche-Comté
- Department: Saône-et-Loire
- Arrondissement: Charolles
- Canton: Gueugnon
- Area^{1}: 43.73 km^{2} (16.88 sq mi)
- Elevation: 264 m (866 ft)
- Highest elevation: 391 m (1,283 ft)
- Lowest elevation: 245 m (804 ft)
- Population (2023): 1,433
  - Density: 32.77/km^{2} (84.87/sq mi)
- Time zone: UTC+01:00 (CET)
  - Summer (DST): UTC+02:00 (CEST)
- INSEE/Postal code: 71542 /71320
- ^{1} French Land Register data, which excludes lakes, ponds, glaciers > 1 km^{2} (0.386 sq mi or 247 acres) and river estuaries.

Toulon-sur-Arroux (French pronunciation: [tulɔ̃ syʁ aʁu], literally Toulon on Arroux) is a commune in the Saône-et-Loire department in the region of Bourgogne-Franche-Comté in eastern France.

== See also ==
- Communes of the Saône-et-Loire department
