= Gueugnon =

- Commune
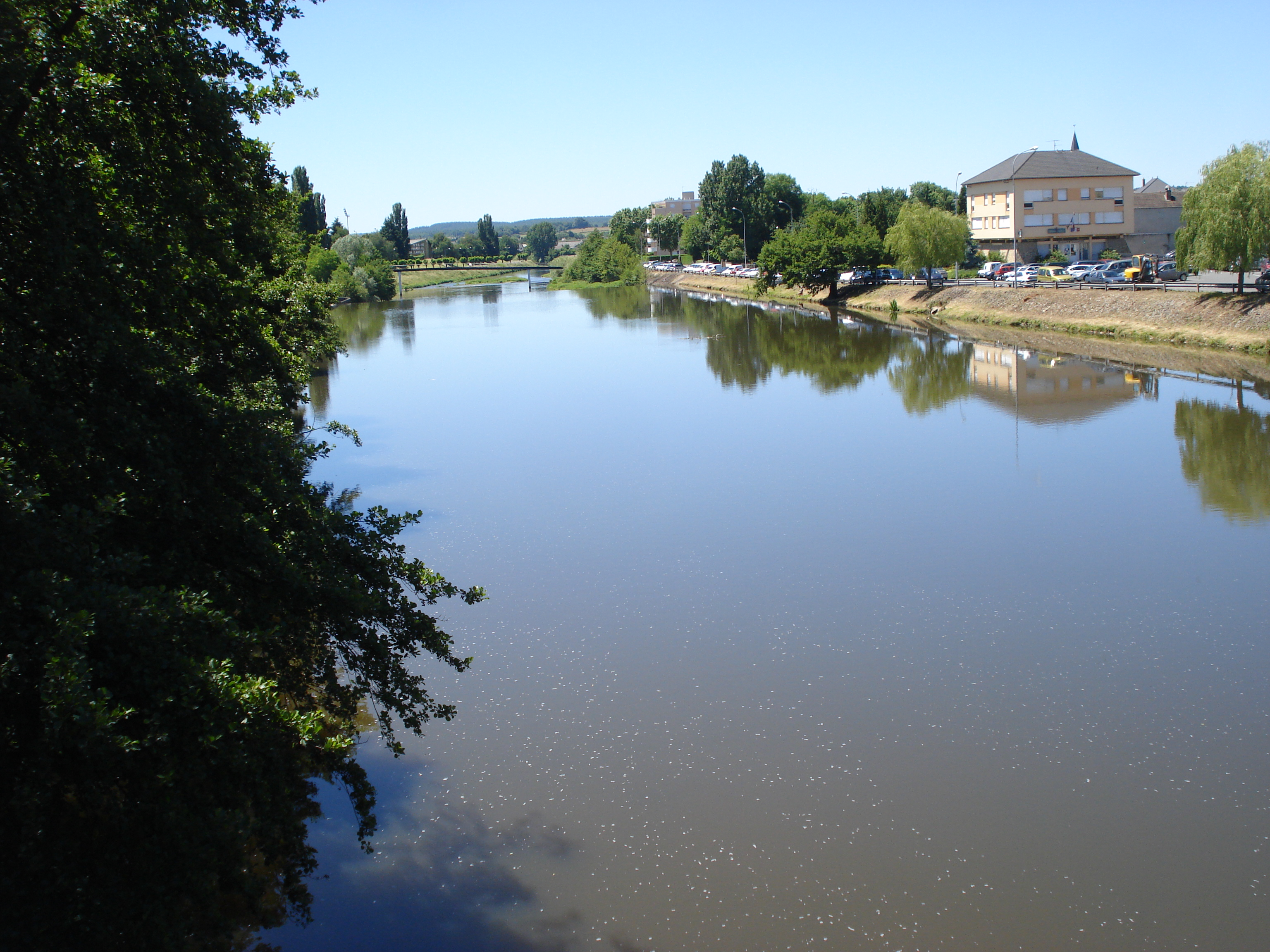
- The Arroux river in Gueugnon

- Coat of arms
- Location of Gueugnon
- Location within France Location within Bourgogne-Franche-Comté
- Coordinates: 46°36′07″N 4°03′42″E
- Country: France
- Region: Bourgogne-Franche-Comté
- Department: Saône-et-Loire
- Arrondissement: Charolles
- Canton: Gueugnon

Government
  - Mayor (2020–2026): Dominique Lotte
- Area^{1}: 28.51 km^{2} (11.01 sq mi)
- Elevation: 243 m (797 ft)
- Highest elevation: 352 m (1,155 ft)
- Lowest elevation: 233 m (764 ft)
- Population (2023): 6,528
  - Density: 229.0/km^{2} (593.0/sq mi)
- Time zone: UTC+01:00 (CET)
  - Summer (DST): UTC+02:00 (CEST)
- INSEE/Postal code: 71230 /71130
- ^{1} French Land Register data, which excludes lakes, ponds, glaciers > 1 km^{2} (0.386 sq mi or 247 acres) and river estuaries.

Gueugnon (French pronunciation: [ɡøɲɔ̃]) is a commune in the Saône-et-Loire department in the region of Bourgogne-Franche-Comté in eastern France.

== Population ==
Historical population
Year	Pop.	±% p.a.
1968	9,268	—
1975	10,739	+2.13%
1982	10,456	−0.38%
1990	9,697	−0.94%
1999	8,563	−1.37%
2007	7,826	−1.12%
2012	7,367	−1.20%
2017	6,992	−1.04%
2023	6,528	−1.14%
Source: INSEE

== Economy ==
The primary industry in the town is a stainless-steel factory run by Aperam. A huge part of Gueugnon's economy is based on cow breeding, mostly because the city is located in the Charolais area. There is also an industrial and touristic zone 3 kilometers south of Gueugnon called Chazey with a sand quarry, a transport company and 5 ponds mostly used by anglers and canoe clubs.

Gueugnon is a twin town of Otterberg, Germany.

== Tourism ==
In Bourgogne-Franche-Comté, you can see :

- The Arboretum de Pézanin, one of the richest forest collection in France,
- The Rock of Solutré,
- The Cluny abbey, and its medieval city,
- Charolles and the "boeuf charolais",
- Mâcon, Paray-le-Monial,
- The Canal Bridge in Digoin,
- Diverti'Parc in Toulon sur Arroux,
- Touroparc Zoo in Romanèche-Thorins,
- Nicéphore-Niépce museum in Chalon-sur-Saône.

== Climate ==
On average, Gueugnon experiences 66.6 days per year with a minimum temperature below 0 °C (32.0 °F), 1.4 days per year with a minimum temperature below −10 °C (14.0 °F), 8.6 days per year with a maximum temperature below 0 °C (32.0 °F), and 18.7 days per year with a maximum temperature above 30 °C (86.0 °F). The record high temperature was 41.5 °C (106.7 °F) on 31 July 2020 and 27 June 2026, while the record low temperature was −22.0 °C (−7.6 °F) on 16 January 1985.

Climate data for (1981–2010 normals, extremes 1979–2022)
Month	Jan	Feb	Mar	Apr	May	Jun	Jul	Aug	Sep	Oct	Nov	Dec	Year
Record high °C (°F)	18.2 (64.8)	21.8 (71.2)	25.8 (78.4)	29.5 (85.1)	33.8 (92.8)	41.5 (106.7)	41.5 (106.7)	41.0 (105.8)	36.4 (97.5)	29.4 (84.9)	24.8 (76.6)	18.6 (65.5)	41.5 (106.7)
Mean daily maximum °C (°F)	5.8 (42.4)	7.5 (45.5)	11.9 (53.4)	15.4 (59.7)	19.7 (67.5)	23.4 (74.1)	26.5 (79.7)	26.1 (79.0)	21.8 (71.2)	16.6 (61.9)	10.0 (50.0)	6.3 (43.3)	15.9 (60.6)
Daily mean °C (°F)	2.8 (37.0)	3.7 (38.7)	7.1 (44.8)	10.1 (50.2)	14.2 (57.6)	17.5 (63.5)	20.1 (68.2)	19.8 (67.6)	16.1 (61.0)	12.1 (53.8)	6.5 (43.7)	3.5 (38.3)	11.1 (52.0)
Mean daily minimum °C (°F)	−0.3 (31.5)	−0.1 (31.8)	2.4 (36.3)	4.7 (40.5)	8.6 (47.5)	11.7 (53.1)	13.8 (56.8)	13.4 (56.1)	10.4 (50.7)	7.6 (45.7)	3.0 (37.4)	0.7 (33.3)	6.3 (43.4)
Record low °C (°F)	−22.0 (−7.6)	−14.3 (6.3)	−13.1 (8.4)	−5.3 (22.5)	−1.7 (28.9)	2.1 (35.8)	5.0 (41.0)	4.0 (39.2)	0.0 (32.0)	−7.0 (19.4)	−11.0 (12.2)	−12.8 (9.0)	−22.0 (−7.6)
Average precipitation mm (inches)	70.3 (2.77)	62.7 (2.47)	59.5 (2.34)	66.4 (2.61)	80.7 (3.18)	69.6 (2.74)	64.0 (2.52)	63.2 (2.49)	73.2 (2.88)	83.1 (3.27)	83.6 (3.29)	82.5 (3.25)	858.8 (33.81)
Average precipitation days (≥ 1.0 mm)	12.3	10.5	10.4	10.7	11.9	9.3	8.2	7.9	8.3	11.2	11.9	12.6	125.2
Source: Meteociel

== See also ==
- FC Gueugnon
- Communes of the Saône-et-Loire department
