= Issy-l'Évêque =

- Commune
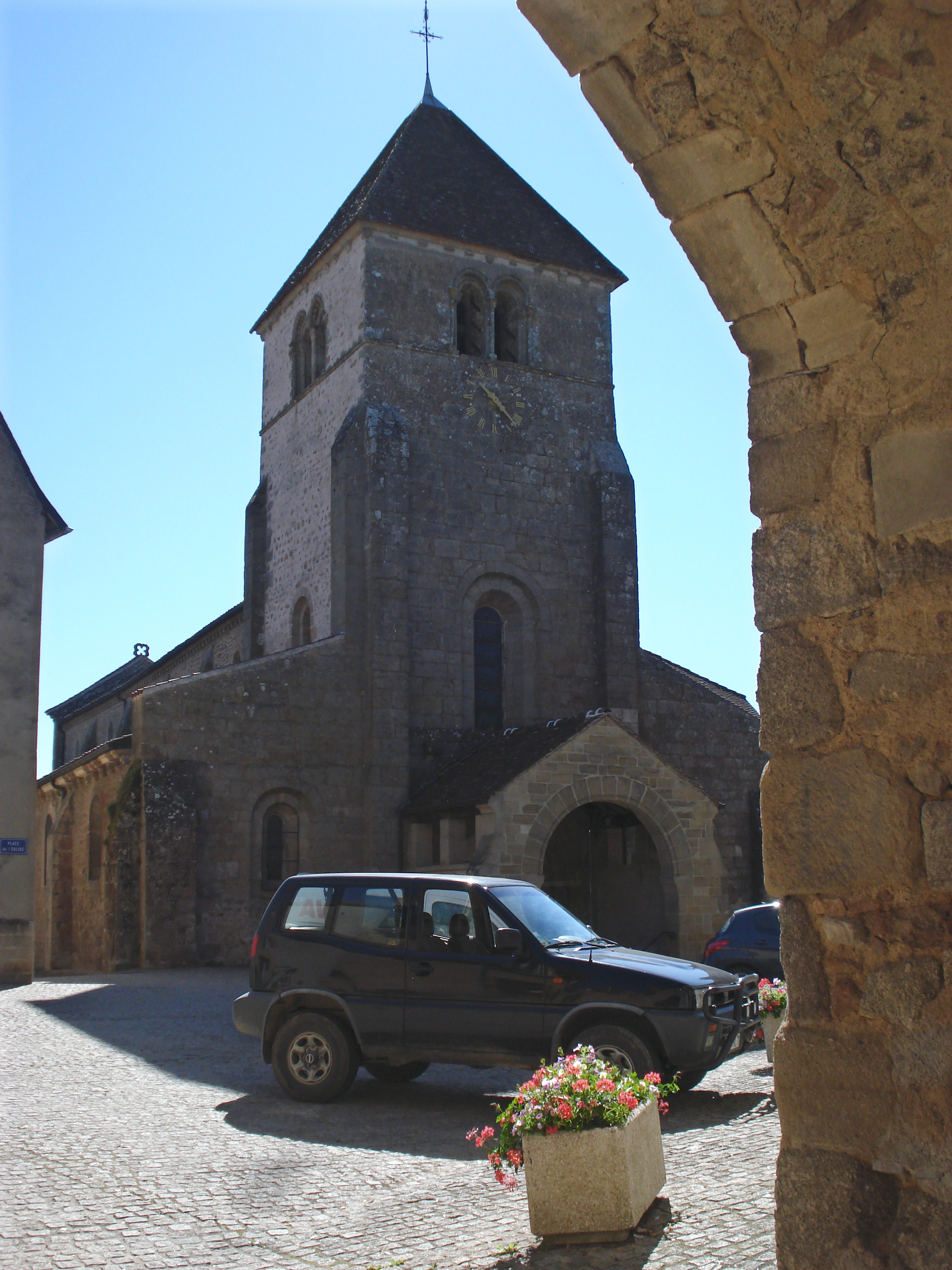
- The church in Issy-l'Évêque

- Coat of arms
- Location of Issy-l'Évêque
- Location within France Location within Bourgogne-Franche-Comté
- Coordinates: 46°43′00″N 3°58′00″E
- Country: France
- Region: Bourgogne-Franche-Comté
- Department: Saône-et-Loire
- Arrondissement: Charolles
- Canton: Gueugnon

Government
  - Mayor (2020–2026): Serge Nivot
- Area^{1}: 71.13 km^{2} (27.46 sq mi)
- Elevation: 325 m (1,066 ft)
- Highest elevation: 506 m (1,660 ft)
- Lowest elevation: 273 m (896 ft)
- Population (2023): 692
  - Density: 9.73/km^{2} (25.2/sq mi)
- Time zone: UTC+01:00 (CET)
  - Summer (DST): UTC+02:00 (CEST)
- INSEE/Postal code: 71239 /71760
- ^{1} French Land Register data, which excludes lakes, ponds, glaciers > 1 km^{2} (0.386 sq mi or 247 acres) and river estuaries.

Issy-l'Évêque (French pronunciation: [isi levɛːk]) is a commune in the Saône-et-Loire department in the region of Bourgogne-Franche-Comté in eastern France.

== Personalities ==
- Irène Némirovsky (1903–1942), the Ukrainian-Jewish-French novelist lived there during part of World War II; she was arrested in Issy-l'Évêque on 13 July 1942.

== See also ==
- Communes of the Saône-et-Loire department
