= Sainte-Radegonde, Saône-et-Loire =

Sainte-Radegonde
- Commune
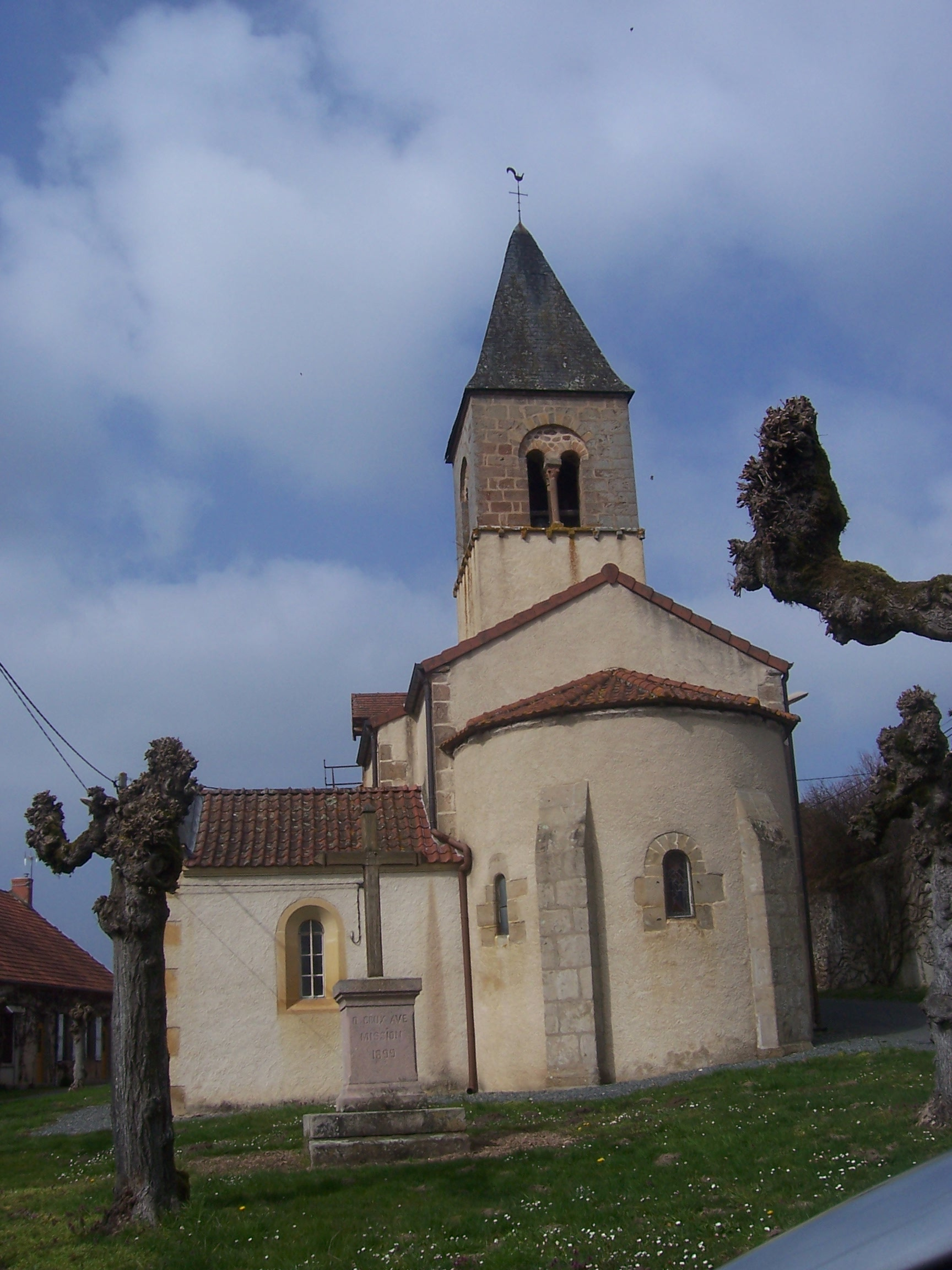
- The church in Sainte-Radegonde

- Coat of arms
- Location of Sainte-Radegonde
- Location within France Location within Bourgogne-Franche-Comté
- Coordinates: 46°41′00″N 4°04′00″E
- Country: France
- Region: Bourgogne-Franche-Comté
- Department: Saône-et-Loire
- Arrondissement: Charolles
- Canton: Gueugnon

Government
  - Mayor (2020–2026): Corine Bidollet
- Area^{1}: 22.95 km^{2} (8.86 sq mi)
- Elevation: 286 m (938 ft)
- Highest elevation: 470 m (1,540 ft)
- Lowest elevation: 255 m (837 ft)
- Population (2023): 146
  - Density: 6.36/km^{2} (16.5/sq mi)
- Time zone: UTC+01:00 (CET)
  - Summer (DST): UTC+02:00 (CEST)
- INSEE/Postal code: 71474 /71320
- ^{1} French Land Register data, which excludes lakes, ponds, glaciers > 1 km^{2} (0.386 sq mi or 247 acres) and river estuaries.

Sainte-Radegonde is a commune in the Saône-et-Loire department in the region of Bourgogne-Franche-Comté in eastern France.

== See also ==
- Communes of the Saône-et-Loire department
