= Arroux =

River in central France

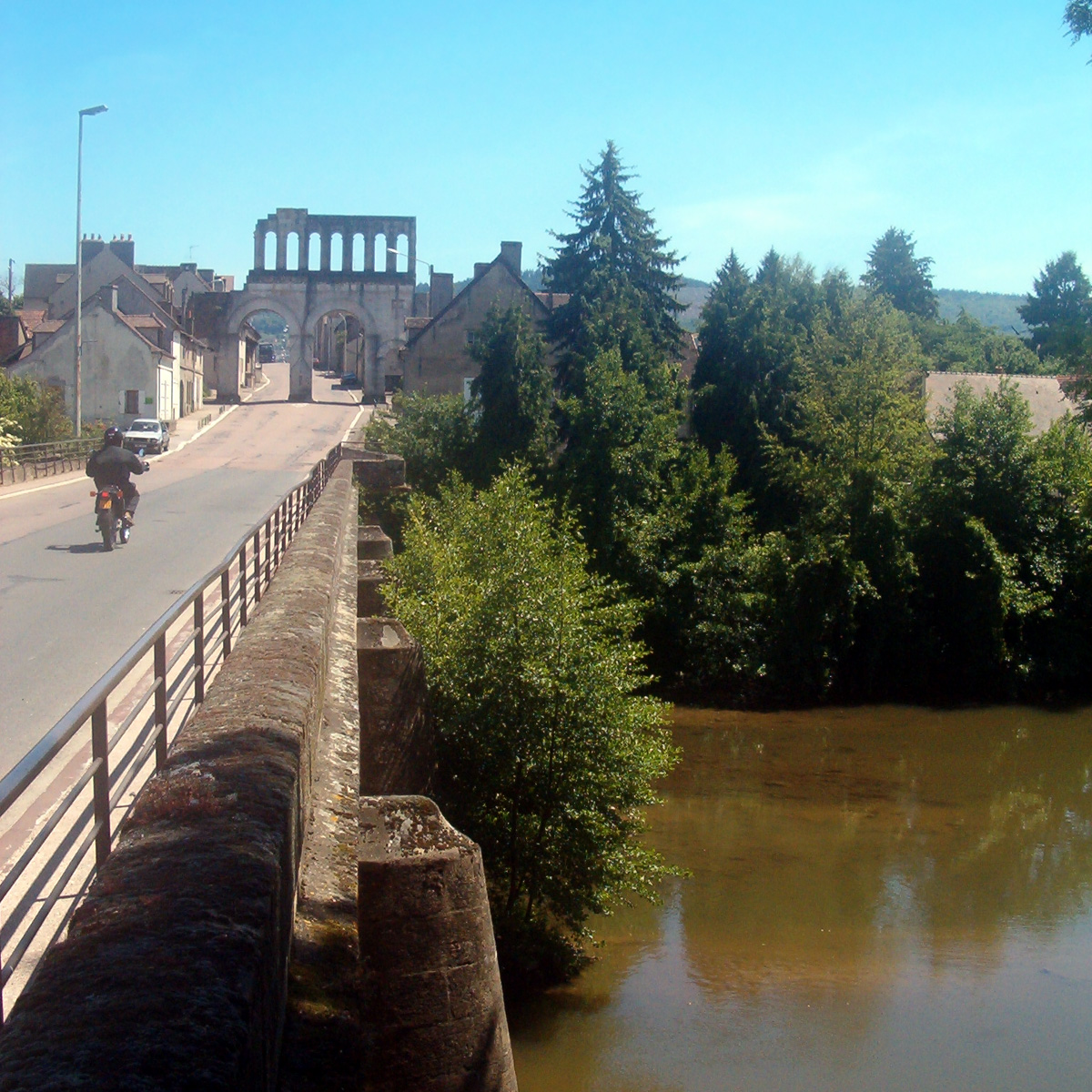
- The Arroux in Autun

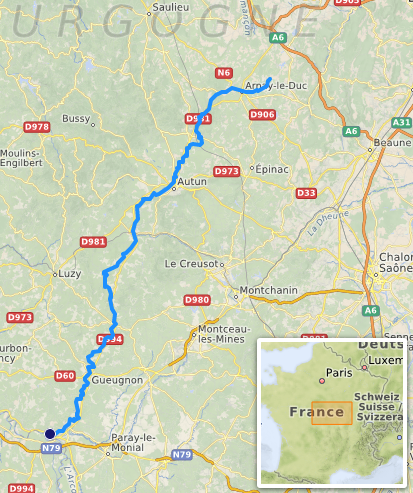

Location
- Country: France

Physical characteristics
- Source
  - location: Burgundy
- Mouth
  - location: Loire
  - coordinates: 46°29′24″N 3°57′33″E
- Length: 128.1 km (79.6 mi)
- Basin size: 3,174 km^{2} (1,225 sq mi)
- Discharge
  - average: 32 m^{3}/s (1,100 cu ft/s)

Basin features
- Progression: Loire→ Atlantic Ocean

The Arroux (French pronunciation: [aʁu]) is a river in central France. It is a right tributary of the Loire. It is 128.1 km (79.6 mi) long. Its source is east of Arnay-le-Duc, in Côte-d'Or. The Arroux flows generally south through the following departments and towns:

- Côte-d'Or: Arnay-le-Duc
- Saône-et-Loire: Autun, Toulon-sur-Arroux, Gueugnon

The Arroux flows into the river Loire near Digoin, the main tributaries are the Ternin (48 km) and the Bourbince (82 km).
