= Damirón =

Damirón is a Spanish surname. Notable people with this surname include:

- Antonio Damirón (1794–1875), Venezuelan publisher
- Casandra Damirón (1919–1983), Dominican singer, dancer and folklorist
- Jean Philibert Damiron (1794–1862), French philosopher
- Francisco Alberto Simó Damirón (1908–1992), Dominican pianist and composer
