= Léon Israël =

French doctor and resistance fighter

- Born: January 13, 1906; Kœnigsmacker, Moselle, France
- Died: April 27, 1944 (aged 38); Mâcon, France
- Cause of death: Assassination by the Milice of Lyon
- Occupations: Doctor, resistance fighter
- Known for: Providing medical assistance to the resistance fighters, caring for the needy

Léon Israël, also known as Dr. Israël, born on January 13, 1906, in Kœnigsmacker and assassinated by the Milice of Lyon on April 27, 1944, in Mâcon was a French doctor, resistance fighter, and Jew. Before World War II, he pursued studies at the Faculty of Medicine in Strasbourg and quickly became a respected physician, collaborating notably with Max Aron.

Originally from Moselle, he joined his family in Mâcon in 1941 after they sought refuge there. He clandestinely provided medical assistance to the resistance fighters in the city and surrounding areas. He also provided care to the needy in the region, earning the appreciation of the population of Mâcon.

While on his way to visit his brother-in-law and sister, he was shot in front of them and his niece by the Milice, in front of the current 116 rue du 28 juin 1944 in Mâcon. After his assassination, the Israël family was hidden by the Blanvillain family, who were recognized as Righteous Among the Nations in 2005.

== Biography ==
=== Birth and youth ===
Léon Israël was born on January 13, 1906, in Kœnigsmacker, in occupied Moselle. His father was named Isaac Israel and was a merchant. His family owned a livestock business. On December 7, 1927, he performed in a comedic duo in Wolfisheim at a ball organized by the Jewish community to celebrate the marriage of the rabbi of Dijon's son to a young woman from the Jewish community of Wolfisheim.

He attended the funeral of Rosa Israël, a member of his family, on May 20, 1932, and also that of Mrs. Abraham Cahen in 1930. In 1929, he attempted the competition to become an intern at the hospital in Strasbourg and was accepted. At the same time, he pursued his thesis, entitled "Benzene Hemopathies", and obtained it with highest honors and congratulations from the jury in 1934. He quickly became the director of a clinic in Strasbourg. In 1934, he was awarded the Prize of the Association of Students and Alumni of the Faculty of Medicine (Strasbourg) and began publishing numerous scientific articles from 1934 to 1935. He also collaborated with Max Aron. After completing his medical studies, he practiced medicine and received patients in Metz, at 42 Rue Serpenoise. He joined the Scientific Society of Lorraine in 1937.

=== Arrival in Mâcon ===
He remained unmarried and continued his medical practice until the Occupation of France, when his brother, sister-in-law, and their children decided to flee Moselle and their hometown of Yutz to seek refuge in the Zone libre.

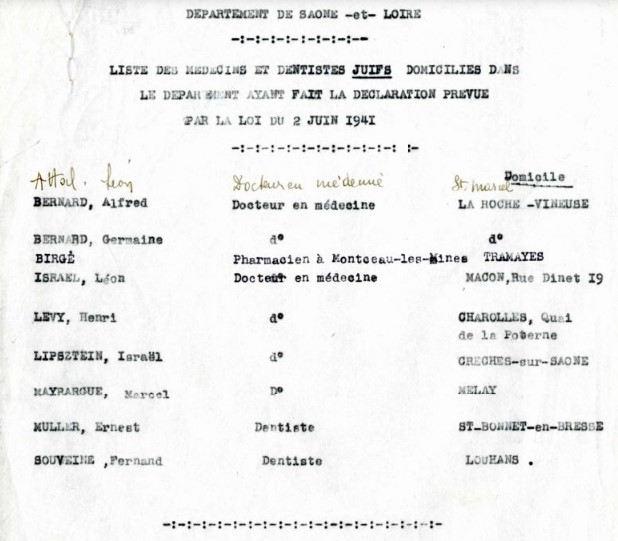
Information form from the collaborationist Prefecture of Saône et Loire containing the name of Dr. Israël (1941/1942).

Dr. Israël followed them in 1941 and joined them in Mâcon, where they were settled and hidden by the local resistance, particularly by Léon-Albert and Renée Blanvillain, Mâcon-based hardware store owners.

=== Resistance ===
While being relatively protected by the resistance, Léon Israël took on the clandestine task of providing medical care to the local resistance fighters and made rounds in the city to assist the impoverished. However, starting in 1942 with Operation Anton, which concluded with the annexation of Vichy France by Nazi Germany, the hunt for Jews, which was already significant, intensified even further, forcing the Israël family into hiding. Léon continued to visit his family in Mâcon, but he was sheltered in Beaujeu by the Rochard family, who owned vineyards there.

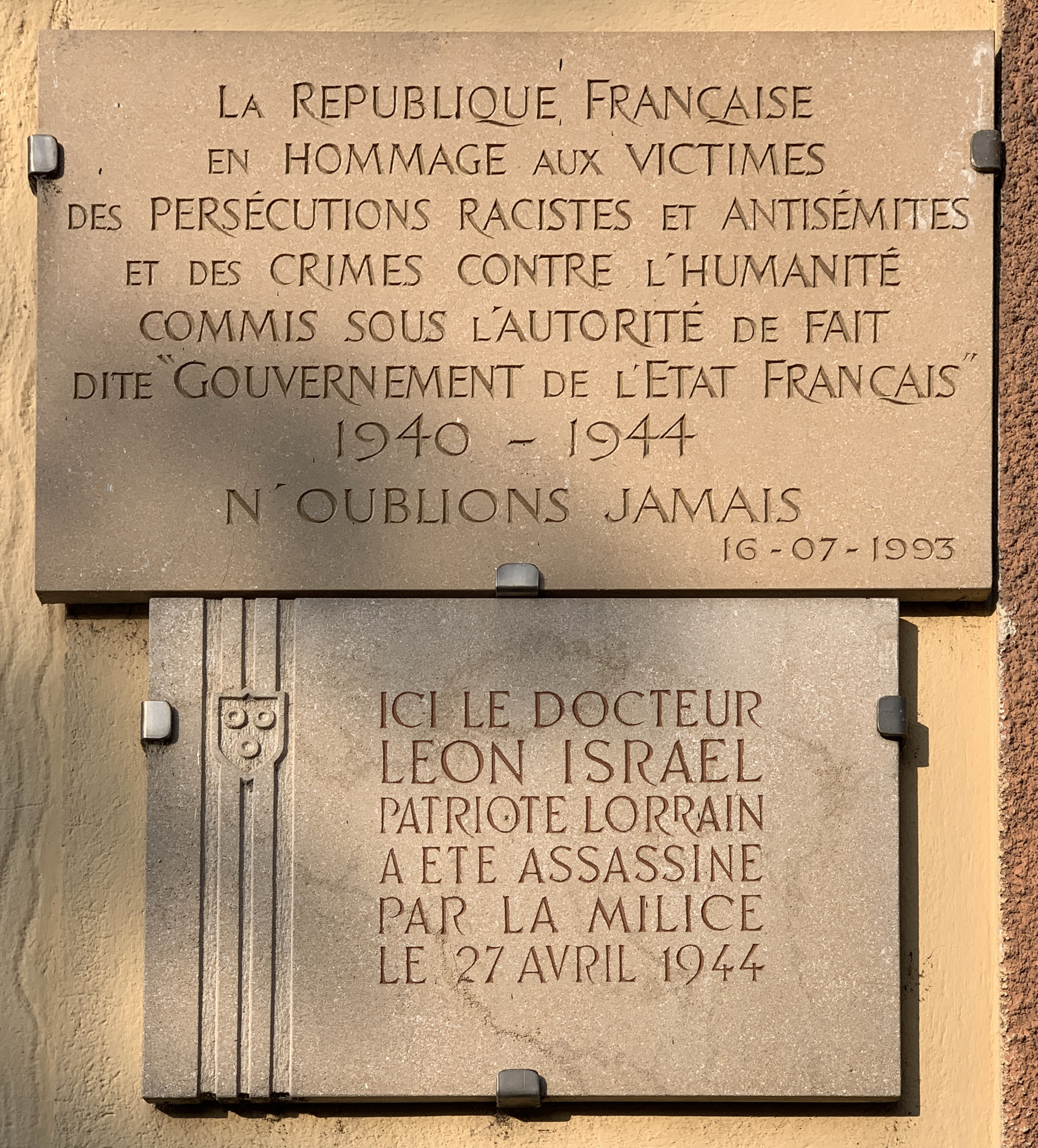
Commemorative plaques at 116 Rue du 28 Juin 1944 in Mâcon, at the site of Dr. Israël's assassination.

He appeared on a prefectural list that recorded Jewish doctors in the department; his address was listed as 19 Rue Dinet in Mâcon.

=== Assassination and aftermath ===
Resistance members attacked a group of Milice members on April 25, 1944. In retaliation, on April 27, 1944, while Léon was discreetly visiting his family on what is now Rue du 28 juin 1944, Léon Israël was arrested on the street by the French Milice, including one André Dumont and one Henri Fournier, who had come from Lyon. They immediately executed him by firing squad. His brother Joseph, sister-in-law Annette, and 5-year-old niece Monique witnessed his summary execution, which took place near their home. During his funeral, the people of Mâcon rallied together, and more than a thousand individuals attended, despite the city still being under occupation.

Following the assassination, the Blanvillain family decided to conceal and extract the Israël family from Mâcon to Sancé until the Liberation of France, when they returned to live in Lorraine.

== Legacy ==
Their families remained close. Claude Blanvillain, who welcomed Monique Israël into his home, died on August 21, 2017, at the age of 83. Monique Israël herself died on January 14, 2023.

In recognition of their actions, Léon-Albert and Renée Blanvillain were awarded the title of Righteous Among the Nations in 2005. Renée Blanvillain received the title in person at the age of 94; her husband Léon-Albert had died in 1991.

An annual tribute is organized in Mâcon in front of the commemorative plaque on April 17, the day of the Vel d'Hiv roundup. In 2023, the tribute took place as scheduled. The Protestant church of Mâcon laid a wreath, and the mayor of Mâcon and the prefect of Saône et Loire also laid wreaths to honor the occasion.

== Works ==
=== Scientific publications ===
- Thesis entitled "Benzene Hemopathies," 1934.
- Histological tests of prehypophyseal hyperfunction in certain obese individuals, Bull. et mém. de la Soc. méd. des hôpitaux de Paris, October 25, 1935 (with Max Aron and A. Jacob).
- Two cases of refractory urticaria. Treatment with epidermal scarifications and histamine. Soc. de Méd. du Bas-Rhin, December 21, 1935 (with M. Jacob and A. Meyer).
- Considerations on the genesis of hyperchlorhydria and its treatment with the combined medication of pantopon, papaverine, and atrinal, Nutrition, 1936 (with M. Schwartz, MM. Merklen, and M. Jacob).
- A case of thrombosis of the inferior vena cava. Thrombophlebitis simulating arterial embolisms and venous origin gangrene (with M. Fontaine and Sousa Pereira), 1936.
- Postoperative complications. Blood. Gastric secretion. Soc. de Méd. du Bas-Rhin, April 1936 (with M. Froehlich).
- Facial paralysis in chronic nephritis, Bull. et mém. de la Soc. méd. des hôpitaux de Paris, June 19, 1936.
- The blood in former gastrectomy patients, Presse médicale, July 1, 1936 (with F. Froehlich).
