= Mâcon =

- Prefecture and commune
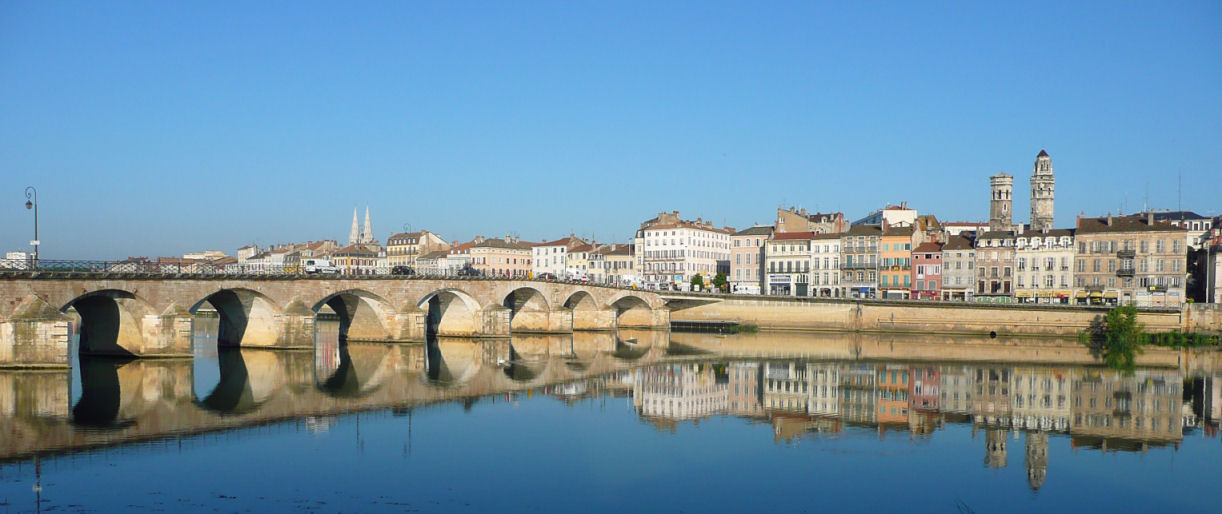
- The river Saône in Mâcon

- Flag Coat of arms
- Location of Mâcon
- Location within France Location within Bourgogne-Franche-Comté
- Coordinates: 46°18′23″N 4°49′53″E
- Country: France
- Region: Bourgogne-Franche-Comté
- Department: Saône-et-Loire
- Arrondissement: Mâcon
- Canton: Mâcon-1 and 2
- Intercommunality: Mâconnais Beaujolais Agglomération

Government
  - Mayor (2020–2026): Jean-Patrick Courtois
- Area^{1}: 27.04 km^{2} (10.44 sq mi)
- Elevation: 175 m (574 ft)
- Highest elevation: 347 m (1,138 ft)
- Lowest elevation: 167 m (548 ft)
- Population (2023): 35,177
  - Density: 1,301/km^{2} (3,369/sq mi)
- Time zone: UTC+01:00 (CET)
  - Summer (DST): UTC+02:00 (CEST)
- INSEE/Postal code: 71270 /71000
- Website: Official website
- ^{1} French Land Register data, which excludes lakes, ponds, glaciers > 1 km^{2} (0.386 sq mi or 247 acres) and river estuaries.

Mâcon (French pronunciation: [mɑ.kɔ̃]), historically anglicised as Mascon, is a city in east-central France. It is the prefecture of the department of Saône-et-Loire in Bourgogne-Franche-Comté. Mâcon is home to about 35,000 residents, who are referred to in French as Mâconnais. The city gave its name to the nearby vineyards and wine AOC.

== Geography ==
The city lies on the western bank of the river Saône, between Bresse in the east and the Beaujolais hills in the south. Mâcon is the southernmost city in the department of Saône-et-Loire and the region of Bourgogne-Franche-Comté. It is 65 kilometres (40 miles) north of Lyon and 400 kilometres (249 miles) from Paris. The climate is temperate with a slight continental tendency.

=== Climate ===
Mâcon features an oceanic climate (Köppen: Cfb), with warm summers, slightly too cool to be called humid subtropical (Cfa). Winters are relatively cold by French standards, but milder and rainier than north of Mâcon. Most precipitation is in spring and autumn.

Climate data for Mâcon (1991–2020 normals, extremes 1943–present)
Month	Jan	Feb	Mar	Apr	May	Jun	Jul	Aug	Sep	Oct	Nov	Dec	Year
Record high °C (°F)	17.8 (64.0)	21.0 (69.8)	24.6 (76.3)	29.8 (85.6)	32.8 (91.0)	37.4 (99.3)	39.2 (102.6)	39.8 (103.6)	35.2 (95.4)	29.5 (85.1)	23.1 (73.6)	19.3 (66.7)	39.8 (103.6)
Mean daily maximum °C (°F)	6.3 (43.3)	8.3 (46.9)	13.2 (55.8)	16.8 (62.2)	20.8 (69.4)	24.8 (76.6)	27.1 (80.8)	26.9 (80.4)	22.3 (72.1)	16.9 (62.4)	10.5 (50.9)	6.7 (44.1)	16.7 (62.1)
Daily mean °C (°F)	3.5 (38.3)	4.6 (40.3)	8.5 (47.3)	11.7 (53.1)	15.7 (60.3)	19.5 (67.1)	21.5 (70.7)	21.1 (70.0)	17.0 (62.6)	12.7 (54.9)	7.4 (45.3)	4.1 (39.4)	12.3 (54.1)
Mean daily minimum °C (°F)	0.7 (33.3)	1.0 (33.8)	3.8 (38.8)	6.5 (43.7)	10.5 (50.9)	14.1 (57.4)	15.9 (60.6)	15.4 (59.7)	11.7 (53.1)	8.6 (47.5)	4.2 (39.6)	1.5 (34.7)	7.8 (46.0)
Record low °C (°F)	−21.2 (−6.2)	−21.4 (−6.5)	−10.2 (13.6)	−4.4 (24.1)	−1.8 (28.8)	3.7 (38.7)	5.9 (42.6)	5.8 (42.4)	1.0 (33.8)	−4.8 (23.4)	−8.7 (16.3)	−16.2 (2.8)	−21.4 (−6.5)
Average precipitation mm (inches)	58.1 (2.29)	48.9 (1.93)	49.1 (1.93)	65.5 (2.58)	75.7 (2.98)	69.8 (2.75)	72.2 (2.84)	72.6 (2.86)	71.1 (2.80)	91.1 (3.59)	92.8 (3.65)	66.8 (2.63)	833.7 (32.82)
Average precipitation days (≥ 1.0 mm)	10.1	8.6	8.6	9.3	10.3	8.7	8.4	8.4	7.4	10.4	11.0	10.7	111.9
Average relative humidity (%)	88	84	77	74	75	73	71	74	80	86	88	89	79.9
Mean monthly sunshine hours	61.6	96.0	163.7	191.7	216.5	249.1	274.9	251.1	194.8	120.3	71.3	52.1	1,943
Source 1: Meteociel
Source 2: Infoclimat.fr (humidity, 1961–1990)

== History ==
=== Ancient and Medieval eras ===
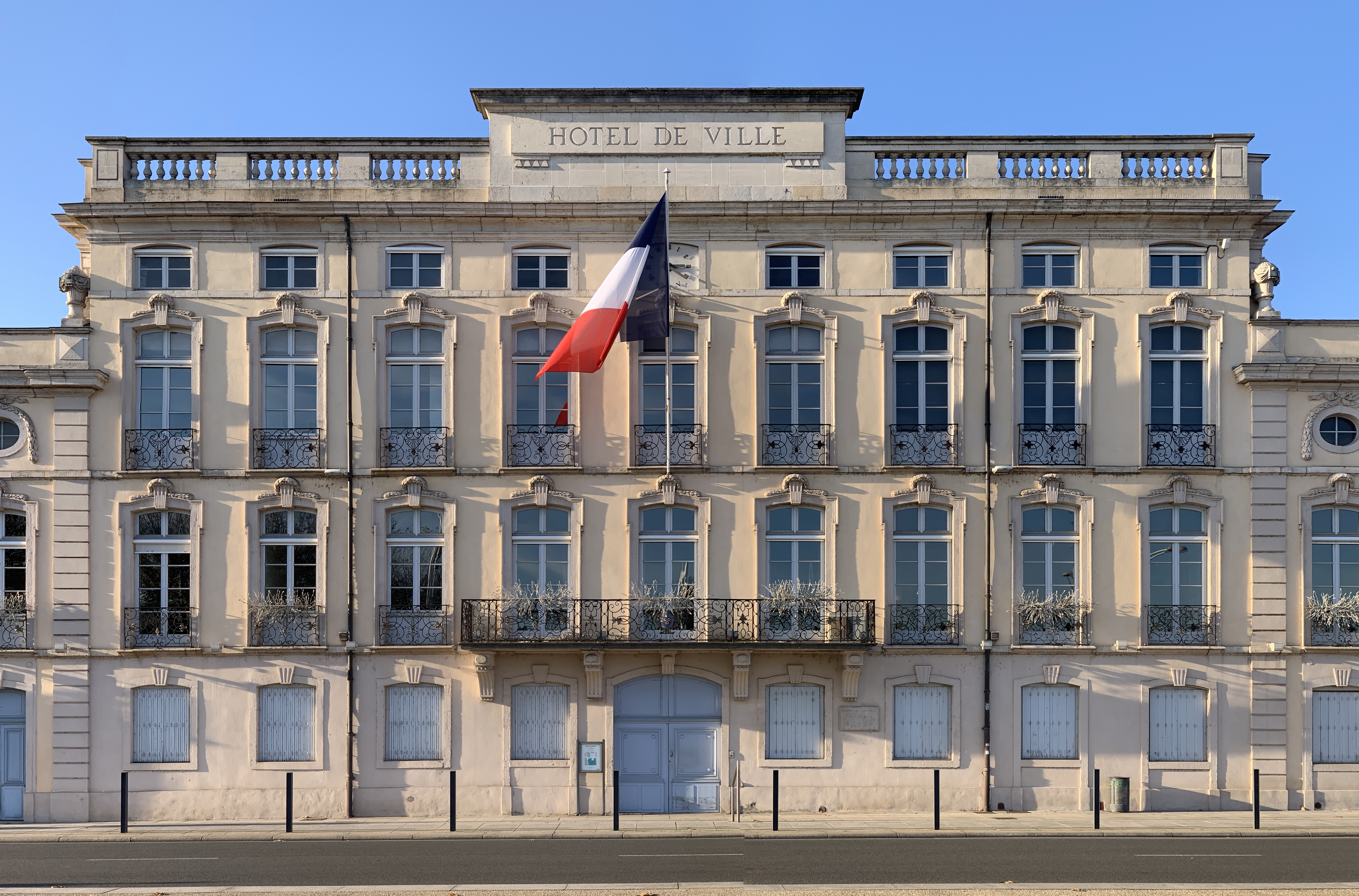
The Hôtel de Ville

The agglomeration of Mâcon originates from the establishment of an oppidum and of a river port by the Celts from the Aedui, probably at the beginning of the first century BC. Known then under the name of Matisco, the town developed significantly during the age of the Roman Empire. This is demonstrated by the large Roman hoard known as the Mâcon Treasure that was discovered in the town in 1764, the remains of which is in the British Museum. During the 4th century, the town was fortified.

During the Middle Ages, Mâcon was the administrative center of a county belonging to the Duchy of Burgundy at the extremity of the bridge over the Saône leading to the Bresse territory belonging to the Duchy of Savoy. The town controlled access to present-day Lamartinien Valley (Val Lamartinien), where the southern end of the Côte de Bourgogne joins the first foothills of the Beaujolais hills, opening the way to the rich plains of the Loire.

The town is strategically built: it was a possible entrance into the kingdom for the Swiss or German mercenaries during the French Wars of Religion. On 3 June 1564, Charles IX from Chalon, stopped in the town during his Royal Tour of France (1564–1566), accompanied by the Court and the nobles of his kingdom, including his brother the Duke of Anjou, Henry of Navarre, the cardinals of Bourbon and Lorraine. He was welcomed by the Queen Jeanne III of Navarre, nicknamed the "Queen of Protestants", and 1,500 Huguenots.

The Hôtel de Ville (town hall) was completed in 1751.

=== Revolutionary and Imperial eras ===
On 21 October 1790, the matriarch of a prominent local family gave birth to a son who remains highly visible in his hometown, the Romantic poet and historian Alphonse de Lamartine.

In 1790, the Revolutionary government designated Mâcon as the capital (chef-lieu) of Saône-et-Loire, a newly created département within the radical restructuring of national administration.

In 1814, the town was invaded by Austrian troops and then liberated twice by French troops before being permanently occupied until the fall of the Empire. After Napoleon's return and the subsequent Hundred Days, Mâcon and the Mâconnais were again captured by the Austrians.

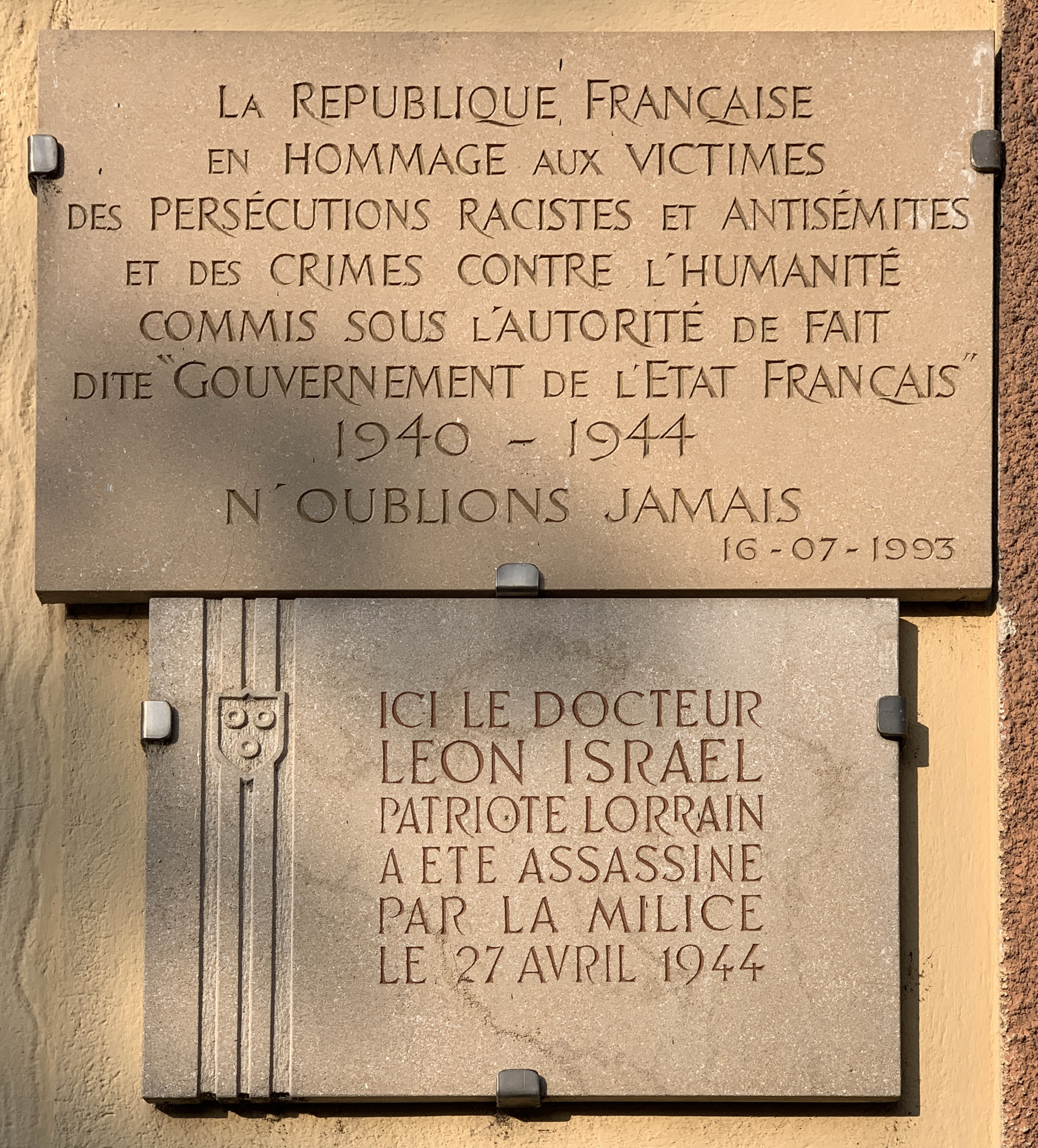
Commemorative plaques at 116 Rue du 28 Juin 1944 in Mâcon, at the site of Léon Israël's assassination

=== Second World War ===
During World War II, Mâcon was the northernmost town in the unoccupied zone libre between Paris and Lyon. On 11 November 1942, following Operation Anton, nearly eight hundred German soldiers settled in the city after crossing the demarcation line. From that date onwards, the Resistance was present in Mâcon. In April 1944, Jewish doctor Léon Israël was assassinated by the Milice.

The town was liberated on 4 September 1944 as part of Operation Dragoon by troops who had landed in Provence.

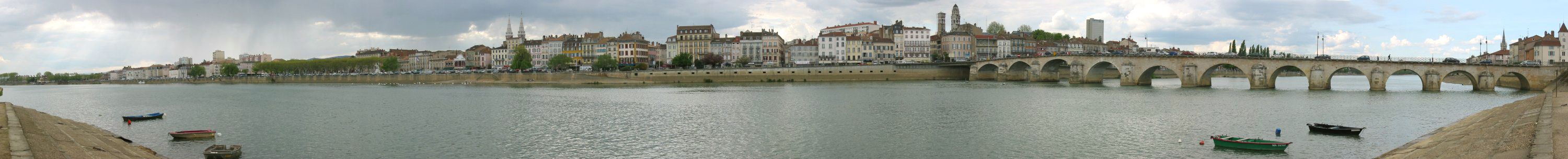
Photograph of the city of Mâcon taken from Saint-Laurent-sur-Saône (Ain), on the other side of the Saône river

== Sights ==
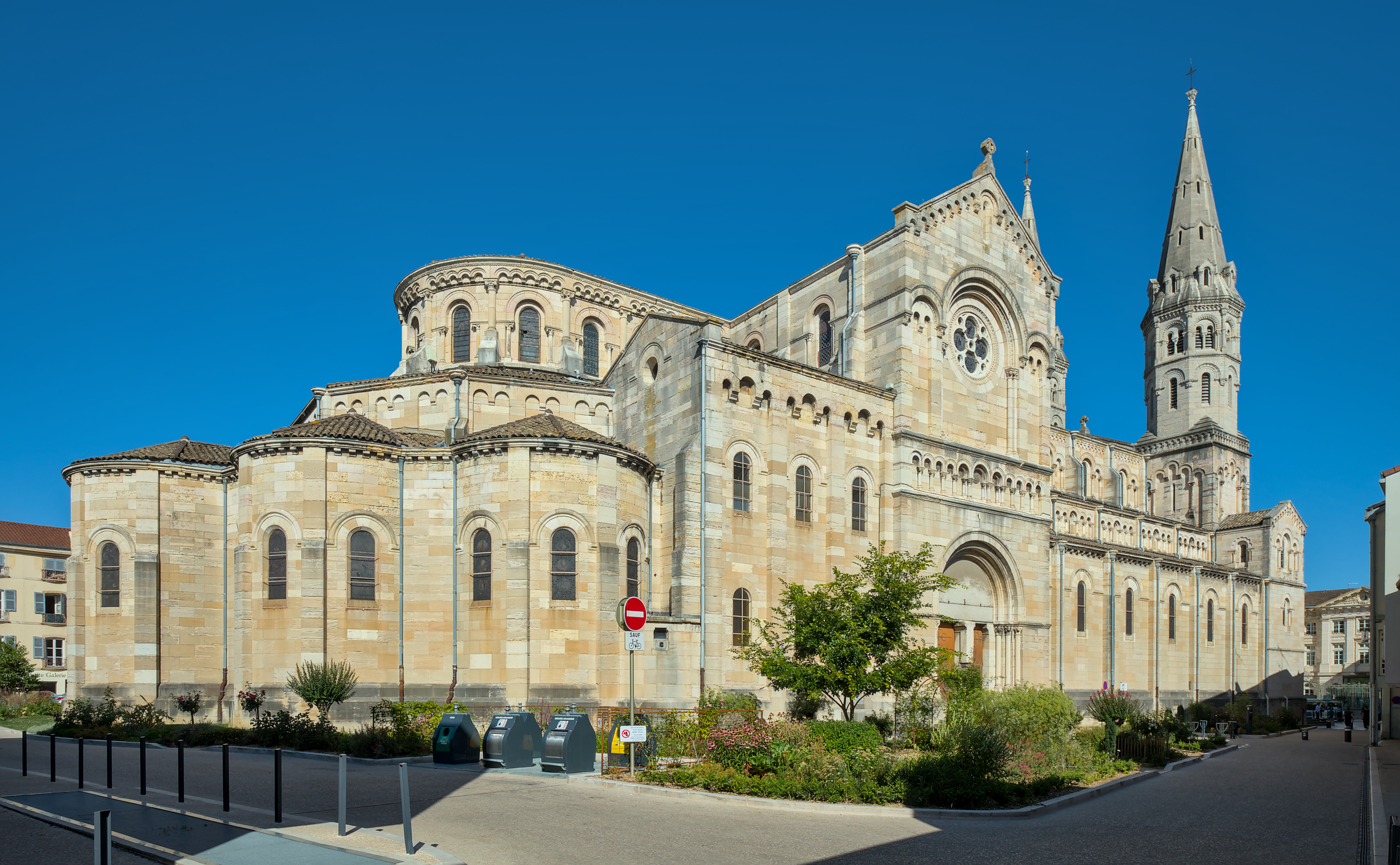
Saint Peter's church

- The Old Saint-Vincent in the town centre
- Mâcon Cathedral (Cathédrale Saint-Vincent de Mâcon) in the town centre
- Museum of Fine Arts (former Ursuline Convent)
- Hôtel de Senecé (Lamartine museum)
- Saint-Clément Catholic Church in the district of Saint-Clément
- Church Saint-Pierre, Place Saint-Pierre, opposite the town hall
- The Municipal Olympic Pool of Mâcon
- The Maison des Vins or Maison Mâconnaise des Vins, on De-Lattre de Tassigny Avenue.
- The Quai Lamartine (quay), the Vallon des Rigollettes, the Physical Activity Training Course (P.A.P.A) and the Marina: many places suitable for walking and relaxing.
- The Theater of Mâcon (public theatre) close to the Maison des vins, Droits de l'Homme esplanade.
- Château Saint-Jean, in the old commune of Saint-Jean-le-Priche annexed to Mâcon in 1972
- Château des Perrières, on a hill overlooking the town

=== Parks and gardens ===
In 2007, the city was awarded the Grand Prix prize and "4 flowers" in the Entente Florale competition.

== Transport ==
Mâcon is connected to neighbouring major cities through various routes:

- Roads:
  - A6 motorway (Route: Paris-Lyon)
  - A40 Motorway (route: Mâcon-Geneva)
  - A406 Motorway (bypass south of Mâcon)
  - Route nationale 6
  - RCEA (Center-Europe-Atlantic road) which allows a direct traffic flow from Annemasse to Nantes or Bordeaux
  - The François Mitterrand Bridge is the second work of construction connecting Mâcon to the left bank of the Saône River
- Railway Infrastructures:
  - Gare de Mâcon Loché TGV (routes: Paris-Marseille and Paris-Geneva)
  - Gare de Mâcon-Ville (routes Dijon–Mâcon–Lyon and Mâcon–Bourg-en-Bresse–Ambérieu-en-Bugey)
- River infrastructures:
  - The Saône river which allows access to the Mediterranean Sea via the Rhône River

=== Public transport ===
Mâcon uses the urban transport service Tréma, run by the organising transport authorities, the SITUM (Inter-communal City Transport Union of Mâconnais – Val de Saône). The SITUM currently consists of 3 members: CAMVAL (Agglomeration Community of Mâcon-Val de Saône) (26 communes) and the Chaintré and Crêches-sur-Saône communes. The Urban Transport Area of the SITUM extends over 28 communes in total.

On the evening of 30 June 2009, the Mâcon Bus services ceased operation. This was due to the public service delegation contract between the SITUM and the Mâcon Bus company (a subsidiary of Transdev), operating the network since 1987, not being renewed at the last call for bids. So since 1 July 2009, the company CarPostal Mâcon (CarPostal France's subsidiary) has been providing city transport services on the network renamed Tréma.

The network Tréma, restructured on 31 August 2009, made the following bid:

- urban lines (A to G) going through Mâcon, Crêches-sur-Saône, Sancé, Saint-Laurent-sur-Saône, central Charnay-lès-Mâcon and Mâcon Loché TGV train station on a regular basis.
- a transport service requested by TrémA'Fil to operate in the other communes of the SITUM area, to increase the frequency of the less busy regular lines (F and G) and to offer a service for each city stop in the morning before the beginning of services for scheduled lines and in the evening after the end of the services.
- school lines named TrémA'Scol.

Mâcon is run by the network Buscephale of Saône-et-Loire's local council.

=== Air transport ===
The nearest airports are Lyon–Saint-Exupéry Airport, located 92 km (57 mi) south and Geneva Airport, located 156 km (97 mi) to the east of Mâcon.

== Administration ==
Mâcon is a member of the Mâconnais Beaujolais Agglomération (agglomeration community), and also its seat.

List of mayors
Term	Name	Party	Position
March 1953 – March 1977	Louis Escande	DVD	
March 1977– March 2001	Michel Antoine Rognard	PS	
March 2001–	Jean-Patrick Courtois	UMP	Senator

=== Education ===
Mâcon has five collèges and four lycées. These establishments are in the same area in the west of the city, with the exception of the collèges Schuman (north) and Saint-Exupéry (south).

- Collèges
  - Collège Louis Pasteur
  - Collège Bréart
  - Collège Schuman
  - Collège Saint-Exupéry
  - Collège Notre-Dame (private)
- Lycées
  - Lycée Lamartine
  - Lycée René-Cassin
  - Lycée hôtelier Dumaine
  - Lycée Ozanam (private)

== Demography ==
Mâcon is one of the department's major employment areas which is by far the most dynamic (13.5% increase between 1999 and 2006) compared to cities such as Chalon-sur-Saône or Montceau-les-Mines which are losing jobs. This dynamism is particularly helped by the many transport links available and its proximity to Lyon.

The population data in the table and graph below refer to the commune of Mâcon proper, in its geography at the given years. The commune of Mâcon absorbed the former commune of Saint-Clément in 1856, Flacé-lès-Mâcon in 1964, Saint-Jean-le-Priche and Sennecé-lès-Mâcon in 1971 and Loché in 1972.

Historical population

Year	Pop.	±% p.a.
1793	12,000	—
1800	10,807	−1.48%
1806	10,653	−0.24%
1821	10,411	−0.15%
1831	12,384	+1.75%
1836	13,515	+1.76%
1841	14,466	+1.37%
1846	15,112	+0.88%
1851	16,783	+2.12%
1856	16,546	−0.28%
1861	18,765	+2.55%
1866	19,175	+0.43%
1872	18,239	−0.83%
1876	17,570	−0.93%
1881	19,567	+2.18%
1886	19,669	+0.10%
1891	19,573	−0.10%
1896	18,739	−0.87%
1901	18,928	+0.20%

Year	Pop.	±% p.a.
1906	19,059	+0.14%
1911	19,779	+0.74%
1921	18,207	−0.82%
1926	18,427	+0.24%
1931	18,496	+0.07%
1936	19,324	+0.88%
1946	21,073	+0.87%
1954	22,393	+0.76%
1962	25,714	+1.74%
1968	33,445	+4.48%
1975	39,344	+2.35%
1982	38,404	−0.34%
1990	37,275	−0.37%
1999	34,469	−0.87%
2007	33,865	−0.22%
2012	32,917	−0.57%
2017	33,638	+0.43%
2023	35,177	+0.75%

Source: EHESS and INSEE (1968–2023)

== Associated districts and communes ==
=== Town centre ===
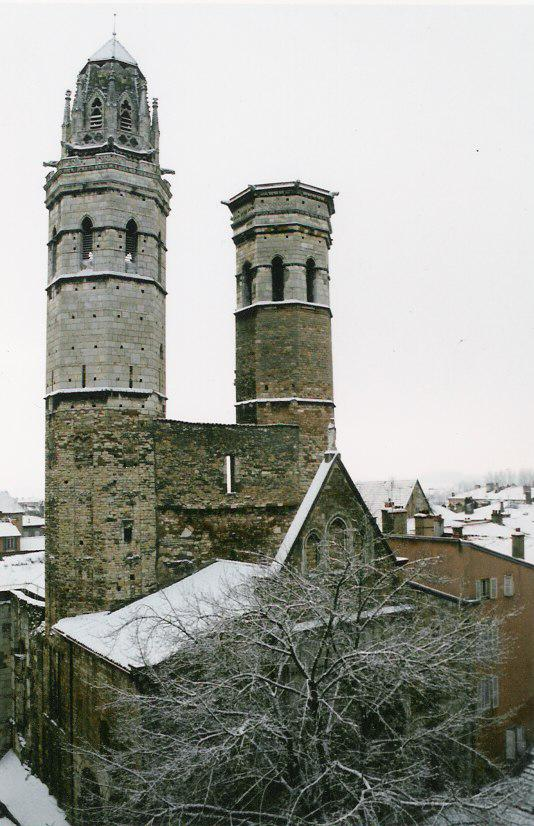
Mâcon Cathedral (Cathédrale le Vieux Saint-Vincent)

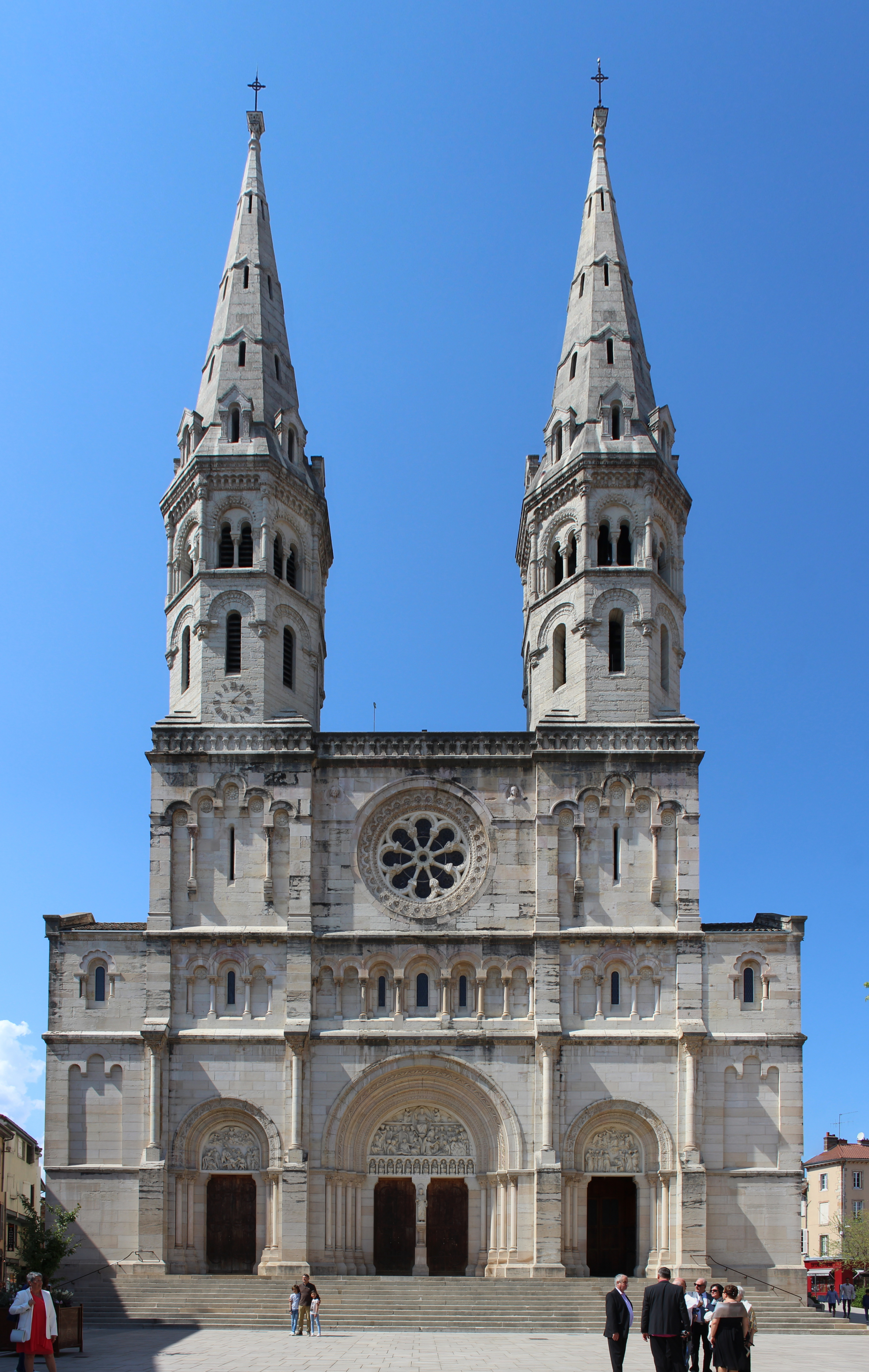
Saint-Pierre Church (1859–1865)

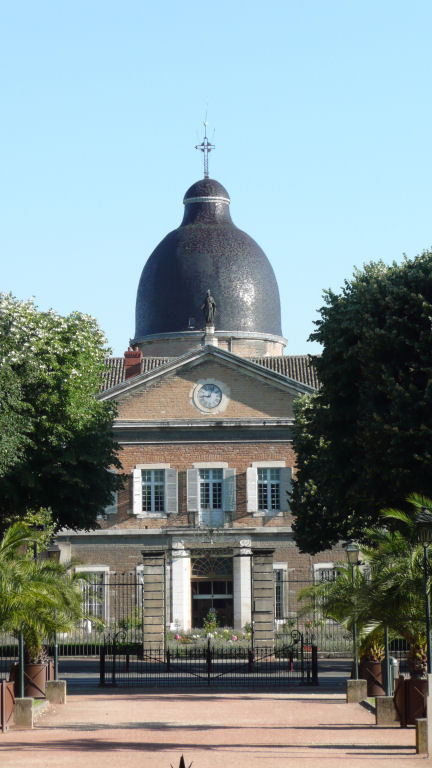
The Hôtel-Dieu, built in the 18th century by Melchior Munet, a student of Soufflot

Mâcon's town center of extends from Place Gardon, in the north, to the Roundabout of Europe in the south, from Place de la Barre, in the west, to the banks along the Saône to the east. The quarters of the town's centre are varied:

1. The center by the town hall is the town's shopping area (rue Carnot, rue Dufour, rue Sigorgne, rue Philibert-Laguiche, rue Dombert, rue Franche, the quay Lamartine, the esplanade Lamartine and rue de la Barre). Most landmarks are in this conventional centre-ville including the Cathedral of Saint-Vincent, the Church of Saint Pierre and the town's two museums.
2. The Saint-Antoine district is centred around the Place aux Herbes and the historic heart despite its relative distance from the town hall. This district covers the northern part of the town centre; it is crossed by the rue de Strasbourg and consists of narrow lanes. There is the prefecture (district headquarters) of Saône-et-Loire and the old Saint-Vincent Cathedral (Vieux Saint-Vincent).
3. West lies the Square de la Paix, bordered by the Hôtel-Dieu, the Palais de Justice, Saint-Vincent Cathedral, plus the Vallon des Rigollettes and the Héritan district.

From the late 1990s to the early 2000s, the esplanade Lamartine underwent extensive redevelopment and upgrades. The winding car park and damaged cobblestones were replaced by an underground car park on three levels, a larger and brighter esplanade, bars, and a stage on the water (of the Saône river) which now accommodates various events, concerts and shows. The Statue Lamartine, which sits proudly on the esplanade, was completely renovated. Small gardens now brighten up the immense space that Mâcon's Esplanade Lamartine occupies. All along, one can find an extract from the famous poem by Alphonse de Lamartine, "Le Lac": "Time, halt in your flight... " engraved in the ground in silver letters.

=== North of Mâcon ===
The north of Mâcon is split, with the Neustadt roundabout marking the boundary between the two sections. Flacé-lès-Mâcon, a village built in the city, constitutes the north-west of Mâcon. In addition to the adjoining Town Hall, church and small downtown area, Flacé consists entirely of residential areas.
The north-east of Mâcon is composed of various residential areas and the town's sport centres (Physical Activity Training Course (P.A.P.A), public swimming pool, Centre for Sports Education, rowing, sailing and water skiing clubs, several football fields and clubs, and the Sports Palace). The residential areas consist mainly of low-rent council estates (HLM) with districts such as the priority development areas (ZUP) of Mâcon or the boulevard des États-Unis (road belonging administratively to the Saugeraies district).

=== South of Mâcon ===
The south of Mâcon is composed of three major areas.

1. The first area is the Saint-Clément/Les Blanchettes block, also called Percée Sud. Saint-Clément only accounts for a small area but it is southern Mâcon's main business area with the Europe roundabout. Les Blanchettes is a district of low-rent council estates (HLM) passing through Édouard-Herriot Avenue. It is a very woody area, which includes most notably the Parc des Allumettes and its numerous games for children. The Romanesque church is in Saint-Clément, bearing the name of this town.
2. The second area is the largest in this part of the town; it is the industrial area south of Mâcon (the largest metropolitan area) which is composed of the Port River at Mâcon (6 in France).
3. The third and final area in the south of Mâcon is the Chanaye / Fontenailles and is southwest of the town. Fontenailles is a residential area consisting of detached houses. La Chanaye (pronounced "Chanai") is an area of low-rent council estates (HLM) bordered by the greenhouses of Mâcon. This district, along with the Boulevard des États-Unis, Saint-Clément/les Blanchettes and priority development areas (ZUP) of Mâcon, belongs to the sensitive urban zones (French ZUS).

=== West of Mâcon ===
The west of Mâcon is the least populated part of the town. This hosts Mâcon's lycées (René Cassin, Lamartine, Alexandre Dumaine and Ozanam) and most of the colleges, along with some residential areas merged with those of Charnay-lès-Mâcon, the Hospital of Mâcon and the historic working class area of Mâcon, Bioux.

=== Flacé ===
Formerly an independent commune, Flacé-lès-Mâcon was re-attached to Mâcon in 1965. It is now a residential area with a very prominent village atmosphere.

=== Associated communes ===
==== Loché ====
Loché is an associated commune of Mâcon. The fusion-association dates from 1972. Mâcon Loché-TGV station is in this wine-producing village.

==== Saint-Jean-le-Priche ====
Saint-Jean-le-Priche is an associated commune of Mâcon. The merging association dates from 1972.

==== Sennecé-lès-Mâcon ====
Sennecé-lès-Mâcon is an associated commune of Mâcon. The merging association dates from 1972.

== Wine ==
The area west and north of Mâcon produces well-known wines from the Chardonnay grape. The best known appellation of the Mâconnais is Pouilly-Fuissé.

== Tourism ==
In Bourgogne-Franche-Comté, you can see:

- The Arboretum de Pézanin, one of the richest tree collections in France, near Mâcon,
- The Rock of Solutré,
- Cluny abbey of vast size and complex elevations and its medieval city of small proportions.
- Charolles and its breed of cattle, "le boeuf charolais".
- Paray-le-Monial with its church modelled as a smaller version of Cluny abbey, cloistered garden, basilica, museum and ornate town hall.

== Economy ==
- Viticulture and maturing
- Industrial River Port
- Metallurgy
- Logistics and road transport
- Boating

Mâcon holds the headquarters of the Chamber of Commerce and Industry of Saône-et-Loire, which manages the river port of Mâcon through Aproport, the Automotive Training Center (CFA Automobile) and the Mâcon-Charnay airport. The headquarters for the Chamber of Agriculture of Saône-et-Loire is also based in Mâcon.

== Culture ==
The "Été frappé" Festival, a free art and music festival, takes place every summer from June to August all over the town (notably on the esplanade Lamartine alongside the river Saône) featuring many concerts of a wide range of musical styles (classical, French song, jazz, rock, folk, hip-hop, rap), many shows (dance, comedy), open air film shows, open air plays, sporting events. In 2011, 48.000 people attended the festival.

== Sports and leisure ==
Mâcon has 73 clubs with 55 organisations, 40 different sports to play, and 14,506 members of a sports association (42% of the population). It was elected the most sportive town in France in 2001.

- The A.S Mâcon rugby club is now progressing to 'Fédérale 2' (the 4th division in the rugby union club championship). They reached the highest level in 1987–1988 (ASM appeared in the Pool league with Biarritz Olympique's Serge Blanco, the US Dax, Montpellier Hérault RC Montpellier and Lavelanet).
- The rowing club (the Régates Mâconnaises) is a leading sport clubs in the town. Each year it organises several major events (regional, national championships) and sends many of its rowers to the biggest competitions. Similarly, each year, the Stade Nautique Mâconnais sends swimmers to the France N1 swimming championships.
- A motor boating Grand Prix is held annually in late September (part of the speed championship of France in categories S2000 and S3000).
- The Municipal Band of Mâcon.
- The Mâcon Academy is extensive and nationally recognised.
- Ski club and barefoot in Mâcon
- UF Mâconnais is the football club of Mâcon. It was the first club of footballer Antoine Griezmann.
- The Parc des Sports et des Loisirs is a sports and leisure park in the north-west outskirts of the city. The park contains the Stade Marie-José Perec and Espace Sportif et de Loisirs Antoine Griezmann, which is an athletics stadium and two synthetic football pitches. There are also tennis courts, archer and the bike park hurigny. Additionally, the park hosts the Association Moto Club de Mâcon (AMCM), which runs motorcycle speedway and flat track racing on the Mâcon speedway track.

== Notable people ==
- Jean-Baptiste Drouet (1763–1824), revolutionary who died in Mâcon.
- Claude-Philibert Barthelot de Rambuteau (1781–1869), politician
- Pierre Boitard (1789–1859), botanist and geologist
- Alphonse de Lamartine (1790–1869), writer, poet and politician.
- Antonio Damirón (1794–1875), French-Venezuelan printer
- Antoinette Henriette Clémence Robert (1797–1872), writer of poetry, stage plays and short stories.
- Alfred Lacroix (1863–1948), geologist and mineralogist.
- Georges Lecomte (1867–1958), writer, novelist and playwright
- Georges Duby (1919–1996), historian of the social and economic history of the Middle Ages.
- Alain Digbeu (born 1975), basketball player
- Antoine Griezmann (born 1991), football player
- Marine Lorphelin (born 1993), Miss France 2013 and 1st Runner-Up to Miss World 2013, was born and raised in Mâcon

== In popular culture ==
- The Baby of Mâcon is a 1993 film directed by Peter Greenaway.
- Mâcon is the hometown of petulant waitress Jessica (Cécile de France) in Avenue Montaigne, Danièle Thompson's 2006 film.

== International relations ==
Mâcon is twinned with:

- Neustadt an der Weinstraße, Germany, since 26 June 1956
- (United Kingdom) Crewe and Nantwich, (Grande Bretagne) depuis 1957
- Overijse, Belgium, since 28 August 1960
- Macon, United States, since 1972
- Lecco, Italy, since 12 May 1973
- Alcázar de San Juan, Spain, since 15 March 1980
- Eger, Hungary, since 11 May 1985
- Pori, Finland, since 11 May 1990
- Santo Tirso, Portugal, since 20 June 1992

== Culinary specialties ==
- Mâcon's sugary specialties are a cake made of meringue and filled with butter cream named "l'idéal mâconnais", and a sugary pâtisserie made of a very thin cigarette-shaped waffle named "la gaufrette mâconnaise" ("gaufrette" meaning "little waffle" in French).
- Mâcon is surrounded by a vineyard of 12,355 acres (5,000 ha) which produces 49 million bottles of wine including the famous crus like Saint-Véran or Pouilly-Fuissé.
- West of Mâcon, there is the Charolais area famous for its white-coated cattle.
- East of Mâcon, on the other side of the Saône river, there is Bresse, famous for its white poultry, the only ones to have received an Appellation d'Origine Contrôlée (AOC) stamp.

== Bibliography ==
- Pierre Goujon (éd.), Histoire de Mâcon, Toulouse, 2000. It consists of:
  - Jean Combier, De la préhistoire aux Burgondes, pp. 17–44
  - Alain Guerreau, Mâcon, 380–1239 : la cité épiscopale, pp. 45–79
  - Isabelle Vernus, Prospérités et affrontements, 1239–1600, pp. 81–112
  - Christine Lamarre, De l'époque classique aux transformations révolutionnaires. La ville classique des XVIIme et XVIIIme siècles, pp. 113–139
  - Jean-François Garmier, L'Essor et les transformations de la ville (17me – 19me siècles), pp. 141–154
  - Pierre Lévêque, Au temps de Lamartine, pp. 155–196
  - Pierre Goujon, Mâcon dans la deuxième moitié du 19me siècle : une ville en symbiose avec sa région, pp. 197–238
  - Lucien Delpeuch, Une ville moyenne face aux défis du 20me siècle : Mâcon de 1914 à 1945, pp. 219–263
  - Annie Bleton-Ruget et Nicole Commerçon, Mâcon, une ville moyenne ordinaire?, pp. 265–300.
- Whitehouse, Henry Remsen (2009) [1918]. The Life of Lamartine, Volume 1. BiblioBazaar. p. 13. ISBN 978-1-115-29659-5.

== See also ==
- Ancient Diocese of Mâcon
- Burgundy wine
- Communes of the Saône-et-Loire department
- Mâconnais (dialect)
