= La Democracia =

La Democracia means "the democracy" in Spanish. The name may refer to:

- La Democracia (newspaper), a Puerto Rican newspaper

== Belize ==
- La Democracia, Belize, village in the Belize District

== Guatemala ==
- La Democracia, Escuintla, municipality in the Escuintla department
- La Democracia, Huehuetenango, municipality in the Huehuetenango department

== Venezuela ==
- La Democracia, Miranda State, a town in the Venezuelan state of Miranda
