= Varennes-lès-Mâcon =

- Commune
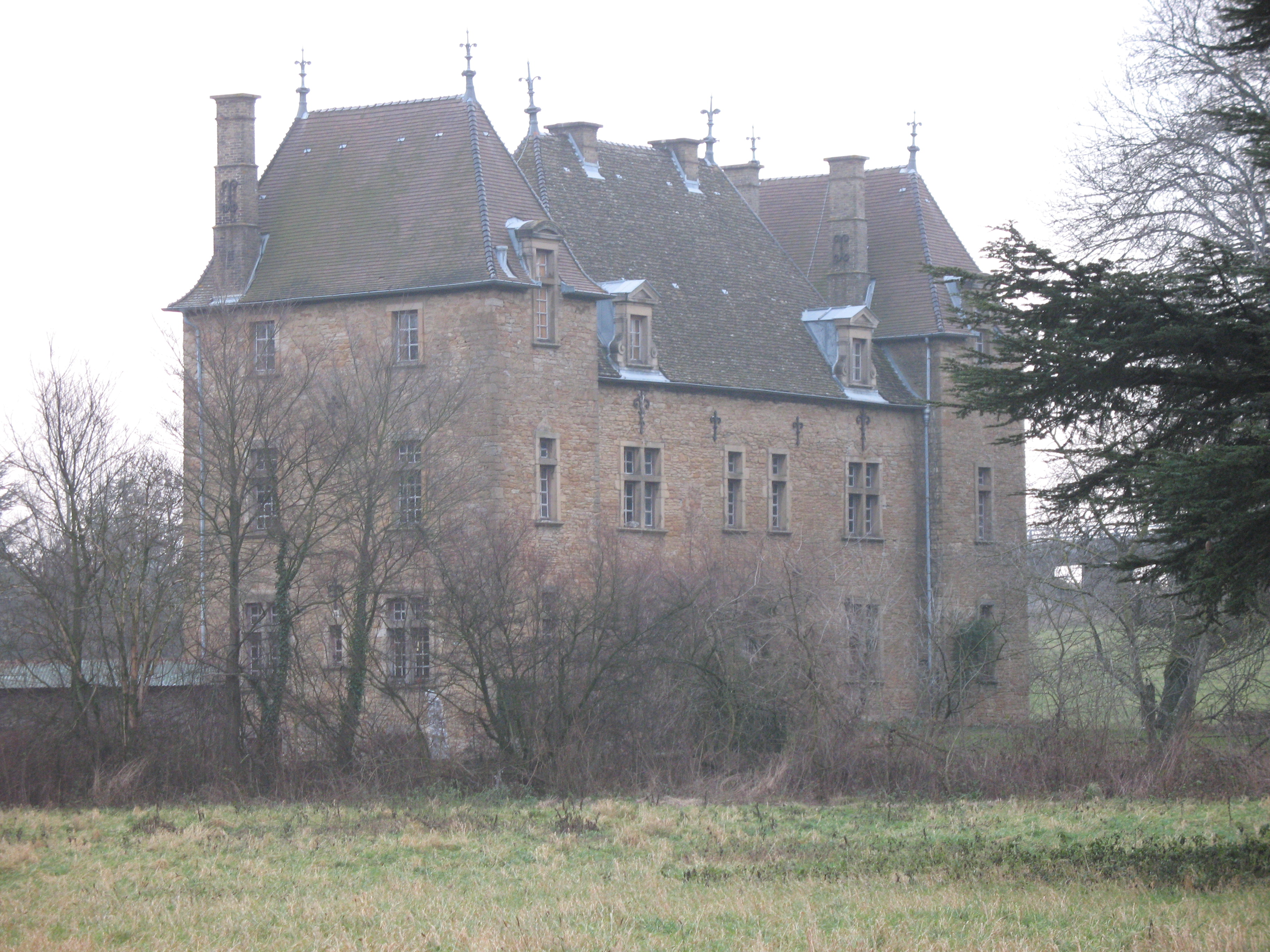
- Château de Beaulieu
- Location of Varennes-lès-Mâcon
- Location within France Location within Bourgogne-Franche-Comté
- Coordinates: 46°16′17″N 4°48′23″E
- Country: France
- Region: Bourgogne-Franche-Comté
- Department: Saône-et-Loire
- Arrondissement: Mâcon
- Canton: Mâcon-2
- Intercommunality: Mâconnais Beaujolais Agglomération
- Area^{1}: 4.75 km^{2} (1.83 sq mi)
- Elevation: 179 m (587 ft)
- Highest elevation: 184 m (604 ft)
- Lowest elevation: 167 m (548 ft)
- Population (2023): 588
  - Density: 124/km^{2} (321/sq mi)
- Time zone: UTC+01:00 (CET)
  - Summer (DST): UTC+02:00 (CEST)
- INSEE/Postal code: 71556 /71000
- ^{1} French Land Register data, which excludes lakes, ponds, glaciers > 1 km^{2} (0.386 sq mi or 247 acres) and river estuaries.

Varennes-lès-Mâcon (French pronunciation: [vaʁɛn lɛ makɔ̃], literally Varennes near Mâcon) is a commune in the Saône-et-Loire department in the region of Bourgogne-Franche-Comté in eastern France.

== See also ==
- Communes of the Saône-et-Loire department
