= Lander Municipality =

Lander Municipality Municipio Lander
- Municipality
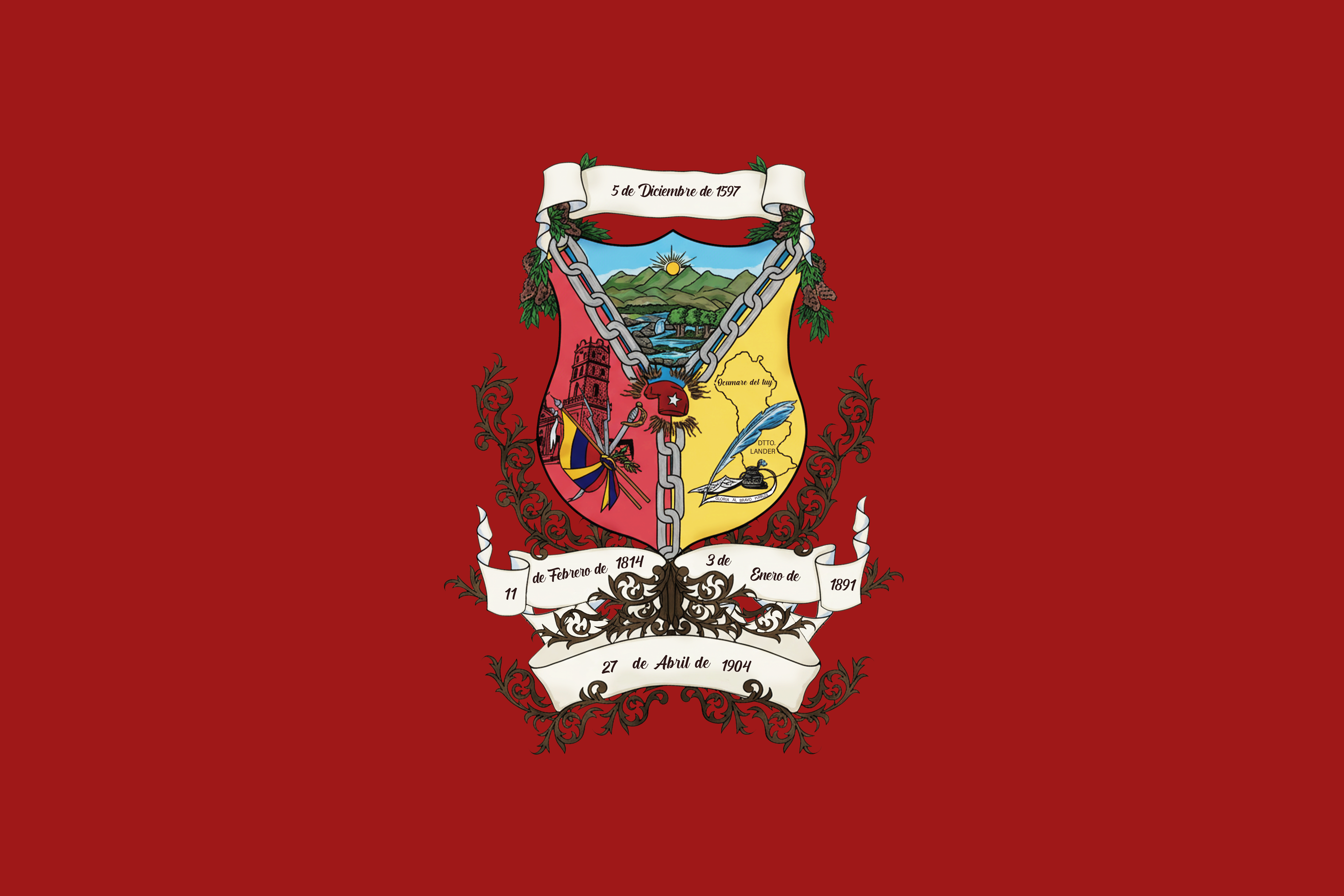
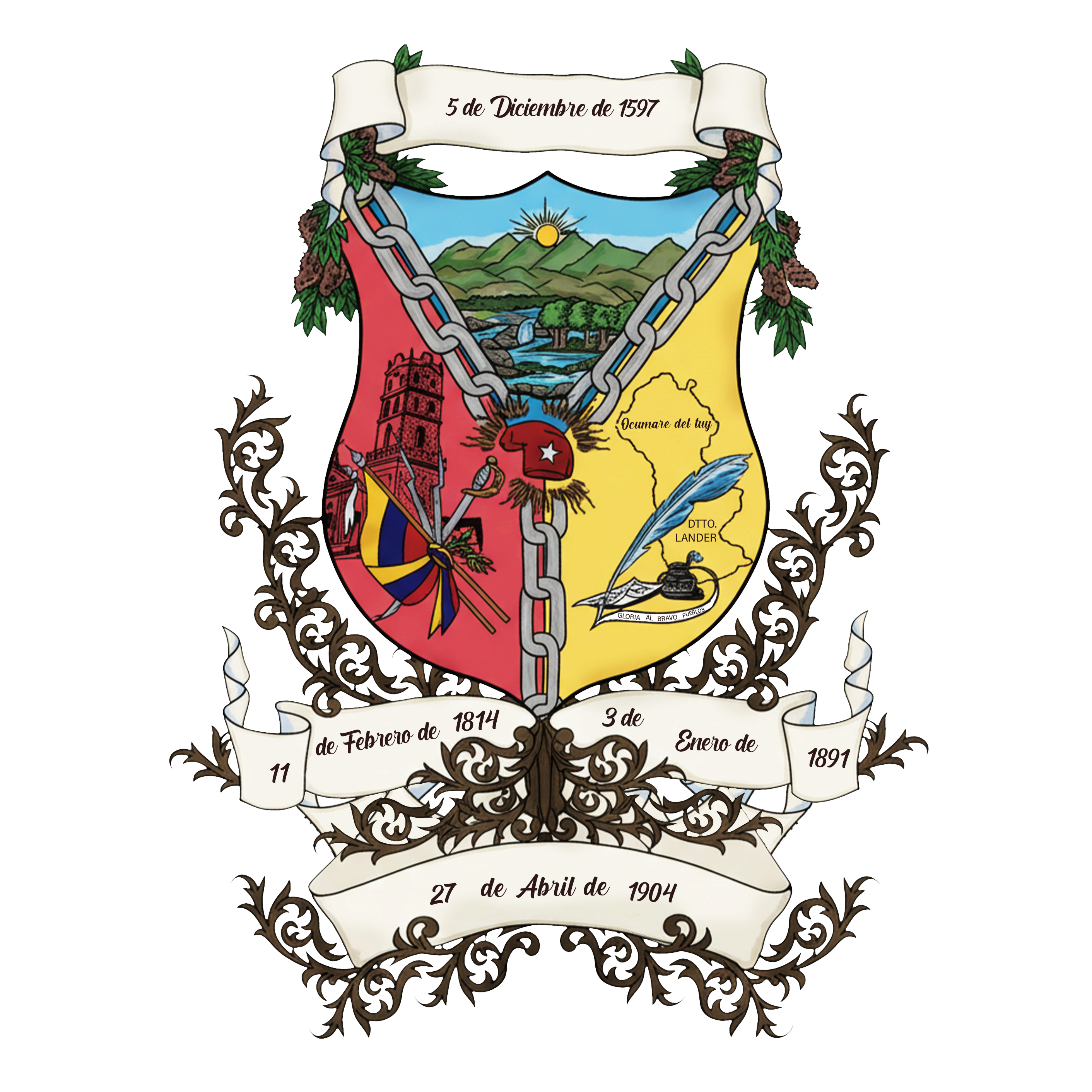
- Flag Coat of arms

- Location in Miranda

- Location in Venezuela
- Coordinates: 10°03′39″N 66°43′17″W
- Country: Venezuela
- State: Miranda
- Municipal seat: Santa Teresa del Tuy

Government
  - Mayor: Dayana Báez Báez (PSUV)

Area
  - Total: 560.9 km^{2} (216.6 sq mi)

Population (2007)
  - Total: 135,739
  - Density: 242.0/km^{2} (626.8/sq mi)
- Time zone: UTC−4 (VET)
- Area code(s): 0239
- Website: Official website

Lander is one of the 21 municipalities (municipios) that makes up the Venezuelan state of Miranda and, according to a 2007 population estimate by the National Institute of Statistics of Venezuela, the municipality has a population of 135,739. The town of Ocumare del Tuy is the municipal seat of the Lander Municipality.

== Demographics ==
The Lander Municipality, according to a 2007 population estimate by the National Institute of Statistics of Venezuela, has a population of 135,739 (up from 117,819 in 2000). This amounts to 4.7% of the state's population. The municipality's population density is 283.97 inhabitants per square kilometre (735.5/sq mi).

== Government ==
The mayor of the Lander Municipality is José Gregorio Arvelo, elected on October 31, 2004, with 53% of the vote. He replaced Manuel Garcia shortly after the elections. The municipality is divided into three parishes; Ocumare del Tuy, La Democracia, and Santa Bárbara.
