= Canton of Mâcon-1 =

Coordinates: 46.32°N 4.82°E

The canton of Mâcon-1 is an administrative division of the Saône-et-Loire department, eastern France. It was created at the French canton reorganisation which came into effect in March 2015. Its seat is in Mâcon.

It consists of the following communes:

1. Charnay-lès-Mâcon
2. Mâcon (partly)
3. Sancé
