= Charnay-lès-Mâcon =

- Commune
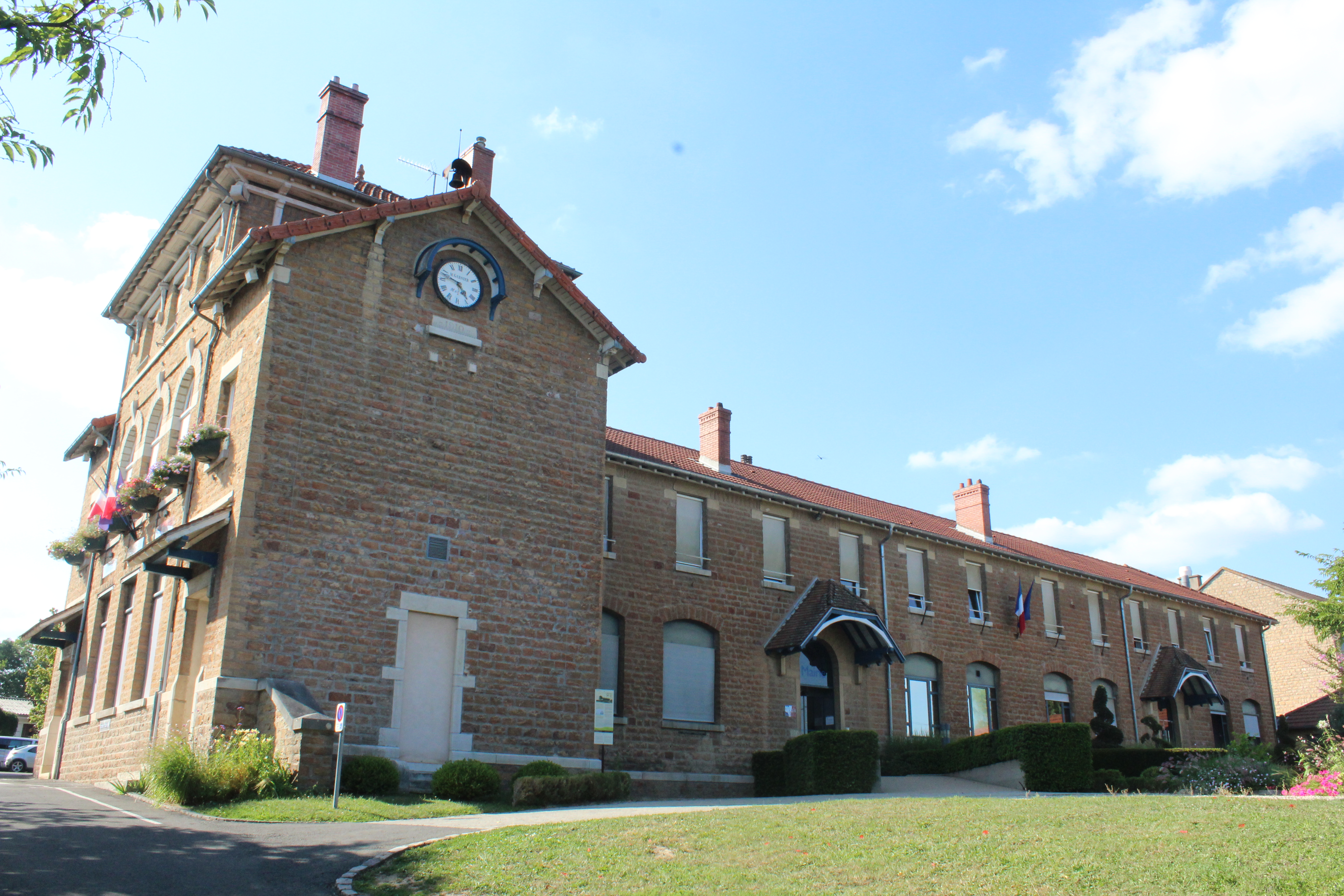
- The town hall in Charnay-lès-Mâcon
- Location of Charnay-lès-Mâcon
- Location within France Location within Bourgogne-Franche-Comté
- Coordinates: 46°18′32″N 4°47′32″E
- Country: France
- Region: Bourgogne-Franche-Comté
- Department: Saône-et-Loire
- Arrondissement: Mâcon
- Canton: Mâcon-1
- Intercommunality: Mâconnais Beaujolais Agglomération

Government
  - Mayor (2020–2026): Christine Robin
- Area^{1}: 12.56 km^{2} (4.85 sq mi)
- Elevation: 196 m (643 ft)
- Highest elevation: 310 m (1,020 ft)
- Lowest elevation: 179 m (587 ft)
- Population (2023): 8,227
  - Density: 655.0/km^{2} (1,696/sq mi)
- Time zone: UTC+01:00 (CET)
  - Summer (DST): UTC+02:00 (CEST)
- INSEE/Postal code: 71105 /71850
- ^{1} French Land Register data, which excludes lakes, ponds, glaciers > 1 km^{2} (0.386 sq mi or 247 acres) and river estuaries.

Charnay-lès-Mâcon (French pronunciation: [ʃaʁnɛ lɛ makɔ̃], literally Charnay near Mâcon; Arpitan: Chârnê) is a commune in the Saône-et-Loire department in the region of Bourgogne-Franche-Comté in eastern France.

== Population ==
Historical population
Year	Pop.	±% p.a.
1968	4,603	—
1975	5,058	+1.36%
1982	5,792	+1.95%
1990	6,102	+0.65%
1999	6,739	+1.11%
2007	6,831	+0.17%
2012	6,874	+0.13%
2017	7,376	+1.42%
2023	8,227	+1.84%
Source: INSEE

== Economy ==
- Wine production
- Mâcon airport

== See also ==
- Communes of the Saône-et-Loire department
