= Hôtel de Ville, Mâcon =

Town hall in Mâcon, France

Hôtel de Ville
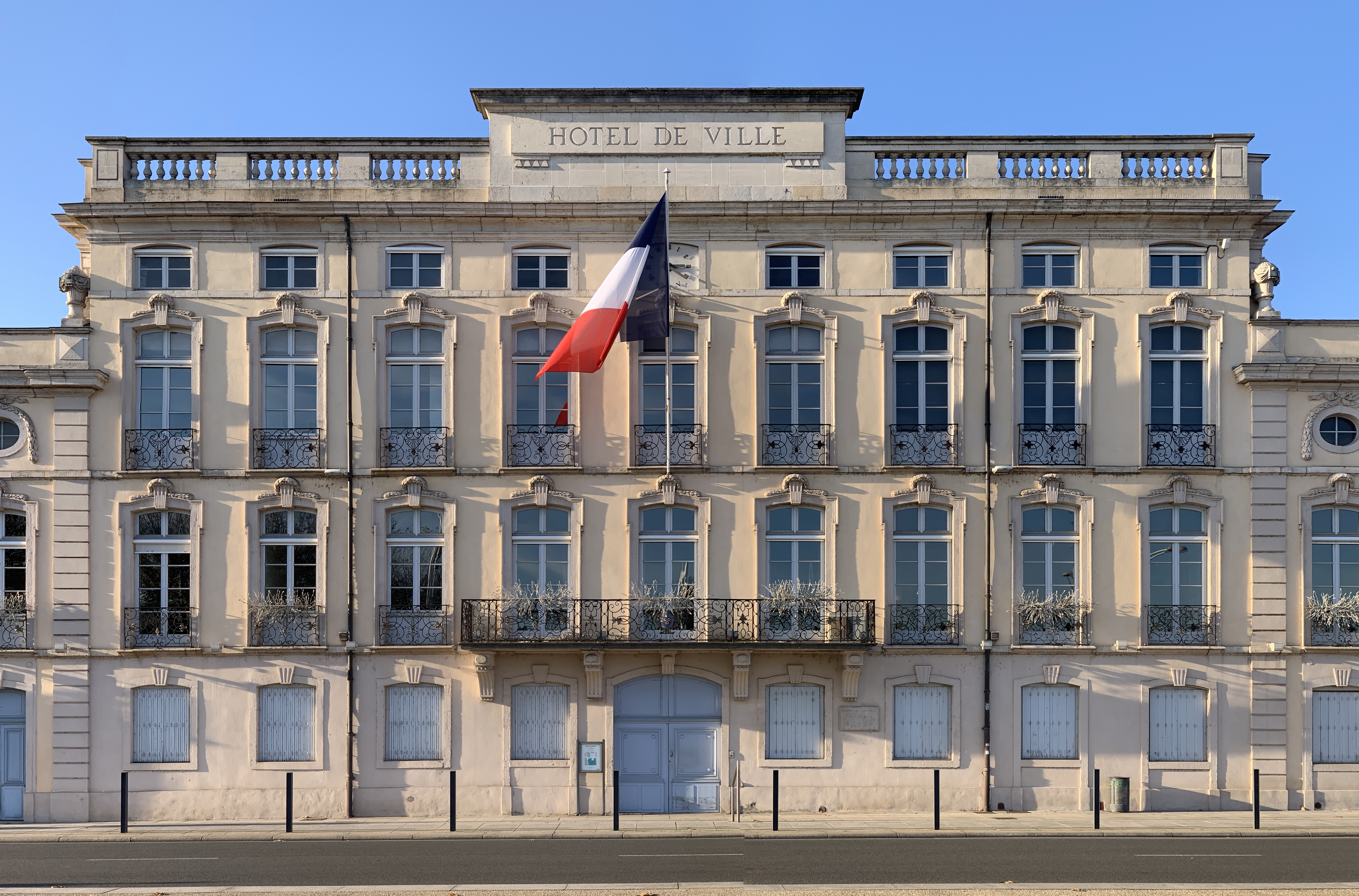
- The main frontage of the Hôtel de Ville in November 2020

General information
- Type: City hall
- Architectural style: Neoclassical style
- Location: Mâcon, France
- Coordinates: 46.3033°N 4.8326°E
- Completed: 1751

Monument historique
- Official name: Hôtel de ville
- Type: Inscrit
- Designated: 1941
- Reference no.: PA00113327

The Hôtel de Ville (French pronunciation: [otɛl də vil], City Hall) is a municipal building in Mâcon, Saône-et-Loire, in east-central France, standing on Quai Lamartine. It was designated a monument historique by the French government in 1941.

== History ==
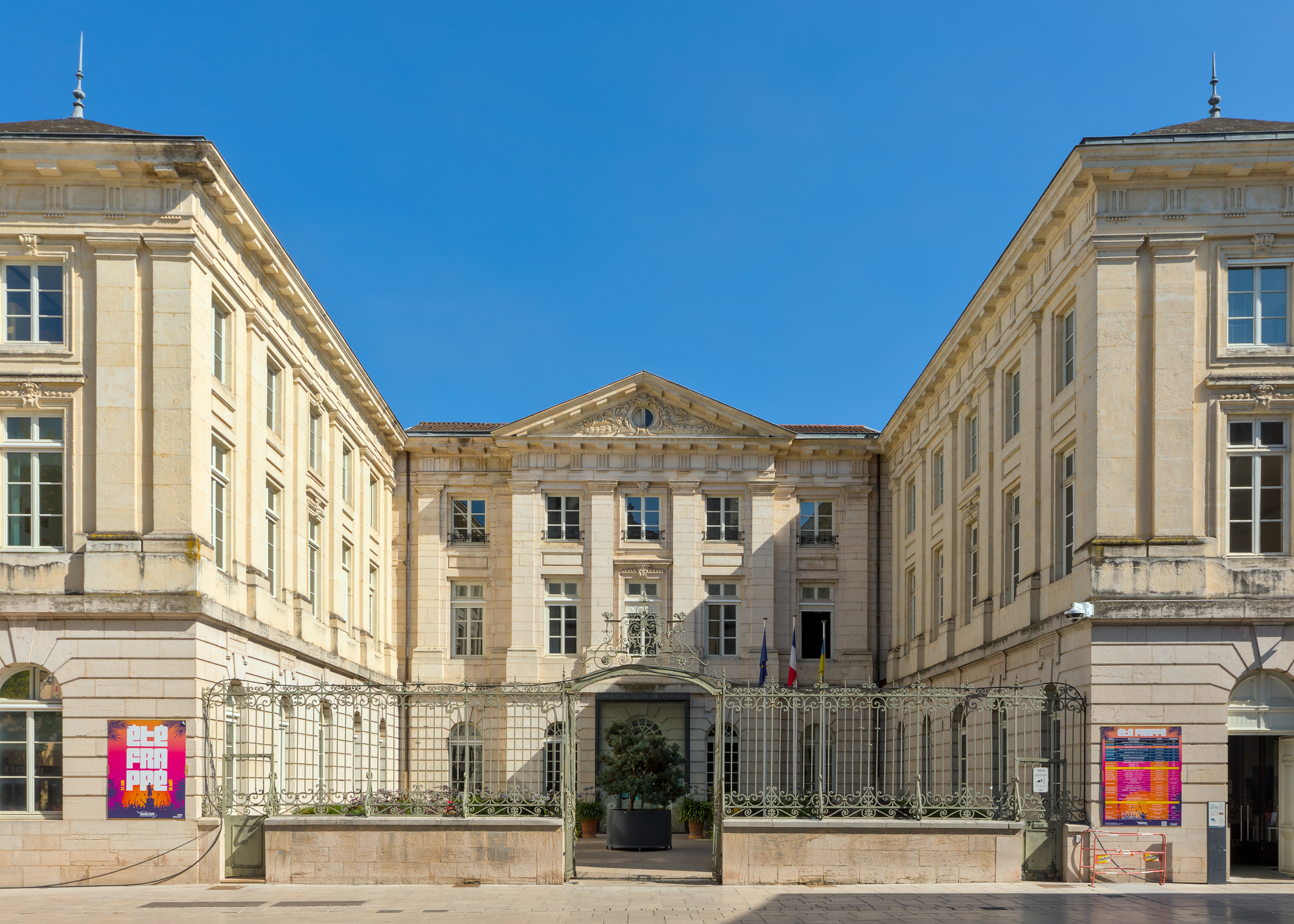
The courtyard facing onto Place Saint-Pierre

The building was commissioned as a private residence by the local seigneur, Michel Pierre Abel Chesnard de Layé, Baron de Vinzelles, in the mid-18th century. The site he chose was on the west bank of the River Saône. Construction of the new building started in 1746. It was designed in the neoclassical style, built in ashlar stone and was completed in 1751.

The original design involved a symmetrical main frontage of nine bays facing onto Quai Lamartine. The central bay featured a doorway with a stone surround and a keystone. The other bays on the ground floor were fenestrated by segmental headed windows with stone surrounds and keystones, while the first and second floors were fenestrated by segmental headed windows with hood moulds and keystones and, at attic level, there were small segmental headed windows with stone surrounds. At roof level, there was a parapet which was broken by a round headed pediment with a clock in the tympanum.

Following the death of Michel Pierre Abel Chesnard de Layé in 1753, the house passed to his son, Pierre-Anne Chesnard de Layé, who was an advisor to the Parliament of Dijon. In 1767, the house was acquired by Florent-Alexandre-Melchior de La Baume, Comte de Montrevel, who added wings on either side of the main block and commissioned a large theatre, complete with a stage and two galleries. He sold the building to the town council led by the mayor, Louis Marie Lagrange, for municipal use in March 1793, just 16 months before he was executed by guillotine in Paris in July 1794 during the French Revolution.

A statue of Alphonse de Lamartine, created by the sculptor, Alexandre Falguière, was unveiled outside the town hall in 1878. In 1880, the town council led by the mayor, François Martin, commissioned two wings at the rear thereby creating a hôtel particulier, with a grand portal, a grand courtyard and two ornate façades. The theatre was badly damaged in a fire on the night of 8 February 1907. After the repairs, the former theatre became the Salle du Conseil (council chamber); the other principal rooms were the Salle des Mariages (wedding room), which was decorated with fine panelling, and the library, which was decorated with portraits of great philosophers.

In 1943, during the Second World War, a statue of Timon of Athens, sculpted by François-Étienne Captier and placed in the courtyard in the late 19th century, was melted down by the German authorities for armament production. Following the liberation of the town by the French 1st Army led by General Jean de Lattre de Tassigny on the 4 September 1944, the new mayor, Pierre Denave, waved to the crowds from the balcony of the town hall.
