= Ocumare del Tuy =

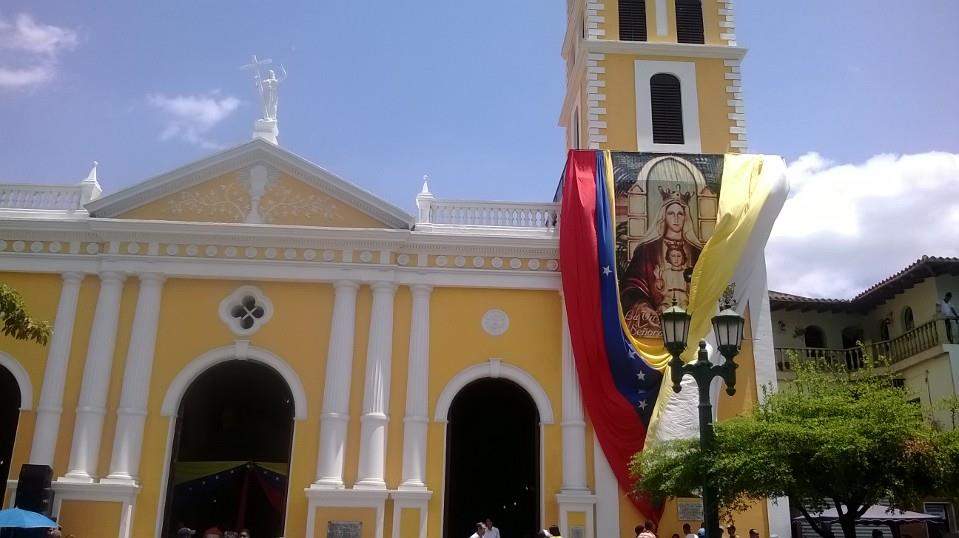

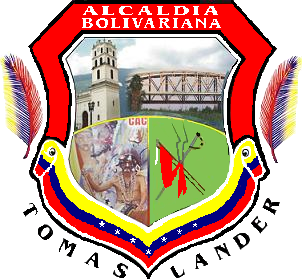
- Coat of arms

- Location within Venezuela
- Coordinates: 10°06′49″N 66°46′53″W
- Country: Venezuela
- State: Miranda
- Municipality: Lander Municipality
- Elevation: 150 m (490 ft)

Population (2019)
  - City: 127,600
  - Estimate (2026): 151,456
  - Rank: 46th in Venezuela
  - Urban: 88,695
  - Metro: 811,166
  - Demonym: Ocumareño/a
- Time zone: VST
- Postal code: 1209
- Climate: Aw

Ocumare del Tuy is a city located in Miranda State in northern Venezuela, the shire town of the Lander Municipality. Located around 30 kilometres (19 mi) from the capital Caracas, The city is noted for its warm and clear weather, with year-round sunshine and 60 days of rainfall annually, and an average temperature that ranges from 64 to 83 °F (18 to 28 °C), but with relatively low humidity.

Ocumare del Tuy has a population of around 197,952 (2016), mainly dedicated to agriculture (cocoa, coffee, sugar cane) and livestock farming (pigs, but also cattle), with leafy forest and meadows.

Ocumare del Tuy was the capital of the state of Miranda between 1904 and 1928, when it moved to Petare and later to Los Teques.

== Notable people ==
- Ozzie Guillén, Former Chicago White Sox manager
- Anthony Ortega, who played for the Los Angeles Angels of Anaheim
- Gregorio Petit, who played for several Major League Baseball teams
- Gregory Vargas (born 1986), basketball player in the Israel Basketball Premier League
- Danry Vasquez, who played for several Major League Baseball teams, and was released following publication of a surveillance video showing him assaulting a woman.
- Elieser Hernández, pitcher for the Los Angeles Dodgers
