= Ozanam =

Ozanam is a surname. Notable people with the surname include:

- Jacques Ozanam (1640–1717), French mathematician
- Frédéric Ozanam (1813–1853), founder of Society of Saint Vincent de Paul
  - Ozanam Building, Adamson University, Manila, Philippines, named after Frédéric
