= La Democracia, Miranda =

- Location in Venezuela
- Coordinates: 10°00′56″N 66°41′14″W
- Country: Venezuela
- State: Miranda State

La Democracia is a town in the state of Miranda, Venezuela. It is part of the Lander Municipality. In 1875, Venezuelan lithographic printer Antonio Damirón donated land from his estate in Miranda to create the municipality.
