= Antonio Damirón =

French-Venezuelan printer

- Born: 1794; Mâcon, France
- Died: 1875 (aged 80–81); Venezuela
- Occupation: Publisher

Antonio Damirón (1794–1875) was a French-Venezuelan printer. Damirón was born in Mâcon, France and established a printing business in Venezuela, where he lived the rest of his life. He is considered to be one of the leading printers in Venezuela in the 19th century, and is attributed with creating the first color prints in Venezuela.

== Career ==
Damirón moved with his family from Saint Thomas to Caracas in 1827, where he quickly received a letter of security to reside in Venezuela.

In 1830, he acquired from Colonel Francisco Avendaño a lithograph workshop located in the port of La Guaira where he began printing colored decks or cards on wooden planks. These were considered as the first colored prints made in Venezuela. By 1831 he acted as representative in charge of the G.F. Devisme printing press, which was selected to print the Gaceta de Venezuela. In 1832 he moved his lithograph printshop to Caracas where he continued to print colored cards which were sold domestically as merchandise imported from Spain.

He also published the newspaper El Nacional (1833–1841), and other Venezuelan newspapers, including El Censor, (1836-?) Un Militar Retirado (1833), and El Republicano (1834–1835).

== Retirement ==
In 1843 he sold his business to the German publisher Muller and Stapler, and retired to his estates in Miranda. Towards the end of his life, Damirón donated some of the land from his estate to create the municipality of Democracia.
