= Sancé, Saône-et-Loire =

Sancé Sencié (Mâconês)
- Commune
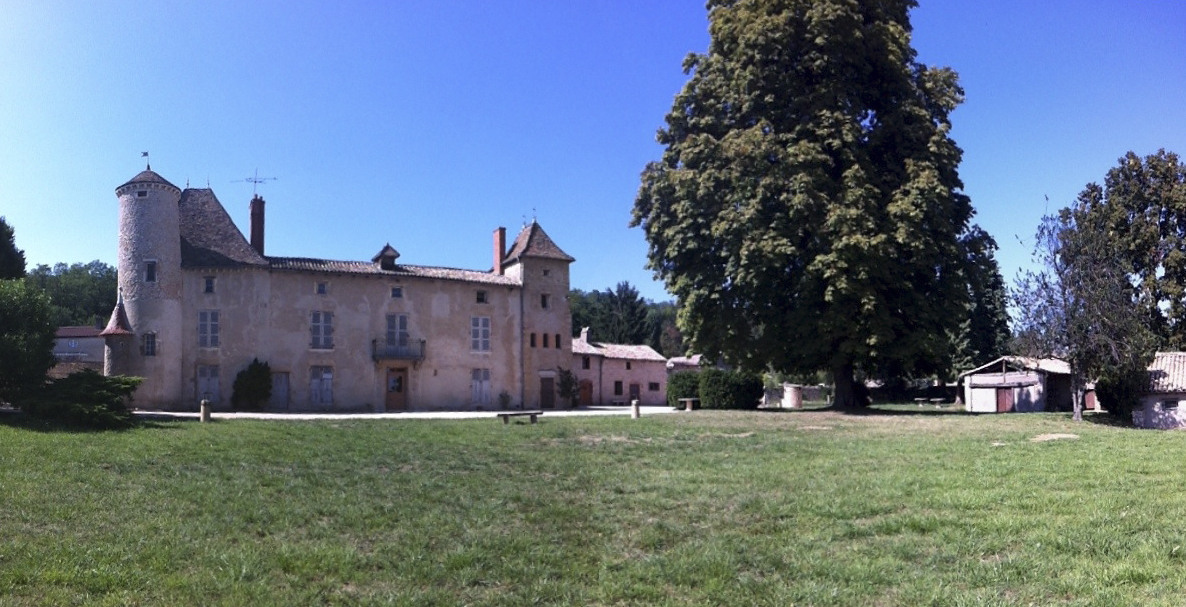
- Chateau Lapalus

- Coat of arms
- Location of Sancé
- Location within France Location within Bourgogne-Franche-Comté
- Coordinates: 46°20′25″N 4°49′50″E
- Country: France
- Region: Bourgogne-Franche-Comté
- Department: Saône-et-Loire
- Arrondissement: Mâcon
- Canton: Mâcon-1
- Intercommunality: Mâconnais Beaujolais Agglomération
- Area^{1}: 6.56 km^{2} (2.53 sq mi)
- Elevation: 200 m (660 ft)
- Highest elevation: 309 m (1,014 ft)
- Lowest elevation: 168 m (551 ft)
- Population (2023): 2,151
  - Density: 328/km^{2} (849/sq mi)
- Time zone: UTC+01:00 (CET)
  - Summer (DST): UTC+02:00 (CEST)
- INSEE/Postal code: 71497 /71000
- ^{1} French Land Register data, which excludes lakes, ponds, glaciers > 1 km^{2} (0.386 sq mi or 247 acres) and river estuaries.

Sancé (French pronunciation: [sɑ̃se]; Mâconês: Sencié [sɛ̃.ˈsi]) is a commune in the Saône-et-Loire department in the region of Bourgogne-Franche-Comté in eastern France.

== Population ==
Historical population
Year	Pop.	±% p.a.
1968	524	—
1975	704	+4.31%
1982	1,265	+8.73%
1990	1,627	+3.20%
1999	1,807	+1.17%
2007	1,850	+0.29%
2012	1,891	+0.44%
2017	2,033	+1.46%
2023	2,151	+0.94%
Source: INSEE

== See also ==
- Communes of the Saône-et-Loire department
