= List of Sidecarcross World Championship records and statistics =

The FIM Sidecarcross World Championship is an annual event, organised by the Fédération Internationale de Motocyclisme (FIM) and held since 1980.

Previous to that, a European competition was held from 1971 onwards, first the FIM Cup and then, from 1975, the FIM European Championship.

All races held since the competitions interception in 1971 were staged in Europe and almost all riders hail from this continent. As World Championship winning riders is concerned, the competition is dominated by a small number of countries, with World Champions coming exclusively from Germany, the Netherlands, Switzerland, Latvia and Belgium.

== Champions ==
The top-three teams season-by-season were:

=== FIM Cup ===
The FIM Cup was the first incarnation of the competition, held from 1971 to 1974:

Season	Winner	Points	Second	Points	Third	Points
1971	(Netherlands) Rikus Lubbers; Bart Notten	77	(United Kingdom) Nick Thompson; Dave Beavis	58	(Belgium) Gustav Cox; Albert Jans	49
1972	(Switzerland) Robert Grogg; Gerhard Martinez	63	(Netherlands) Rikus Lubbers; Bart Notten	62	(Netherlands) Ton van Heugten; Jaak Wery	54
1973	(Switzerland) Lorenz Haller; Samuel Haller	87	(Switzerland) Robert Grogg; Andreas Grabner	80	(United Kingdom) John Elliott; Andy Greenhorn	52
1974	(Switzerland) Robert Grogg; Andreas Grabner	144	(Austria) Bruno Schneider; Werner Fink	106	(United Kingdom) Nick Thompson; Dave Beavis	103

=== FIM European Championship ===
From 1975 to 1979, the competition was called the FIM European Championship:

Season	Winner	Points	Second	Points	Third	Points
1975	(Netherlands) Ton van Heugten; Dick Steenbergen	141	(Switzerland) Robert Grogg; Andreas Grabner	139	(Austria) Bruno Schneider; Werner Fink	131
1976	(Switzerland) Robert Grogg; Andreas Hüsser	139	(Austria) Bruno Schneider; Werner Fink	135	(United Kingdom) Nick Thompson; Gary Withers	120
1977	(Switzerland) Robert Grogg; Andreas Hüsser	168	(Germany) Reinhard Böhler; Hans Georg Peppinghaus	148	(Netherlands) Cor den Biggelaar; Cor van de Bijl	99
1978	(Switzerland) Robert Grogg; Andreas Hüsser	209	(Netherlands) Cor den Biggelaar; Cor van de Bijl	129	(Switzerland) Herbert Bohren; Christoph Langle	118
1979	(Switzerland) Emil Bollhalder; Roland Bollhalder	144	(Switzerland) Robert Grogg; Andreas Hüsser	115	(Netherlands) Cor den Biggelaar; Cor van de Bijl	102

=== FIM World Championship ===
Since 1980, the competition runs under the name of FIM World Championship:

Season	Winner	Points	Second	Points	Third	Points
1980	(Germany) Reinhard Böhler; Siegfried Müller	236	(Switzerland) Hansi Bächtold; Hugo Jung	148	(Austria) Bruno Schneider; Christoph Längle	138
1981	(Netherlands) Ton van Heugten; Frits Kiggen	216	(Germany) Josef Brockhausen; Hubert Rebele	154	(Netherlands) Jan Bakens; Henk van Heek	130
1982	(Switzerland) Emil Bollhalder; Karl Büsser	164	(Germany) Josef Brockhausen; Hubert Rebele	153	(Netherlands) Ton van Heugten; Frits Kiggen	124
1983	(Switzerland) Emil Bollhalder; Karl Büsser	172	(Germany) Josef Brockhausen; Hubert Rebele	144	(Germany) Reinhard Böhler; Franz Burkhardt	139
1984	(Switzerland) Hansi Bächtold; Fritz Fuß	290	(Netherlands) Ton van Heugten; Frits Kiggen	232	(Germany) Reinhard Böhler; Hans Bauer	215
1985	(Switzerland) Hansi Bächtold; Fritz Fuß	290	(Netherlands) August Muller; Henk van Heek	240	(Netherlands) Ton van Heugten; Frits Kiggen	238
1986	(Switzerland) Hansi Bächtold; Fritz Fuß	389	(Netherlands) August Muller; Henk van Heek	282	(Netherlands) Ton van Heugten; Frits Kiggen	246
1987	(Switzerland) Hansi Bächtold; Fritz Fuß	277	(Netherlands) August Muller; Henk van Heek	241	(Netherlands) Rijn van Gastel; Eric Hurkmans	220
1988	(Switzerland) Christoph Hüsser; Andreas Hüsser	333	(Germany) Walter Netterscheid; Jürgen Hassold	292	(Switzerland) Andreas Fuhrer; Hans Ruedi Stettler	223
1989	(Switzerland) Christoph Hüsser; Andreas Hüsser	324	(Netherlands) Benny Janssen; Frans Geurts van Kessel	298	(Netherlands) Eimbert Timmermans; Eric Verhagen	257
1990	(Netherlands) Benny Janssen; Tiny Janssen	220	(Germany) Michael Garhammer; Ralf Haas	207	(Switzerland) Andreas Fuhrer; Hans Ruedi Stettler	204
1991	(Netherlands) Eimbert Timmermans; Eric Verhagen	252	(Belgium) Eddy Ramon; Gino Strubbe	215	(France) Gilles Mecene; Eric Morgan	206
1992	(Netherlands) Eimbert Timmermans; Eric Verhagen	471	(Belgium) Eddy Ramon; Gino Strubbe	410	(Liechtenstein) Andreas Lenherr (Germany) Reinhard Weber	281
1993	(Switzerland) Andreas Fuhrer; Adrian Käser	391	(Germany) Martin Gölz (Switzerland) Hans Ruedi Stettler	309	(Austria) Karl Fussenegger; Josef Meusburger	288
1994	(Switzerland) Andreas Fuhrer; Adrian Käser	232	(Austria) Karl Fussenegger; Josef Meusburger	204	(Germany) Klaus Weinmann; Thomas Weinmann	199
1995	(Switzerland) Andreas Fuhrer; Adrian Käser	261	(Germany) Klaus Weinmann; Thomas Weinmann	233	(Germany) Martin Gölz (Switzerland) Hans Ruedi Stettler	175
1996	(Switzerland) Andreas Fuhrer; Adrian Käser	262	(Germany) Martin Gölz (Switzerland) Hans Ruedi Stettler	235	(Germany) Alois Wenninger (Netherlands) Henry van de Wiel	210
1997	(Latvia) Kristers Serģis; Artis Rasmanis	277	(Germany) Alois Wenninger (Netherlands) Henry van de Wiel	273	(Netherlands) Daniël Willemsen; Marcel Willemsen	271
1998	(Latvia) Kristers Serģis; Artis Rasmanis	299	(Netherlands) Daniël Willemsen; Marcel Willemsen	279	(Germany) Klaus Weinmann; Thomas Weinmann	239
1999	(Netherlands) Daniël Willemsen; Marcel Willemsen	386	(Latvia) Kristers Serģis; Artis Rasmanis	385	(Sweden) Henrik Söderqvist; Tobias Sylwan	267
2000	(Latvia) Kristers Serģis; Artis Rasmanis	352	(Netherlands) Daniël Willemsen (Belgium) Sven Verbrugge	320	(Germany) Klaus Weinmann; Thomas Weinmann	306
2001	(Latvia) Kristers Serģis; Artis Rasmanis	550	(Netherlands) Daniël Willemsen (Belgium) Sven Verbrugge	427	(Sweden) Henrik Söderqvist; Tobias Sylwan	351
2002	(Latvia) Kristers Serģis; Artis Rasmanis	662	(Netherlands) Daniël Willemsen (Belgium) Alfons Eggers	494	(Netherlands) Wilfred van Werven (Belgium) Eli Piccart	434
2003	(Netherlands) Daniël Willemsen (Latvia) Kaspars Stupelis	561	(Latvia) Kristers Serģis (Belgium) Sven Verbrugge	501	(Netherlands) Wilfred van Werven (Belgium) Eli Piccart	382
2004	(Netherlands) Daniël Willemsen (Latvia) Kaspars Stupelis	572	(Germany) Marko Happich; Thomas Weinmann	419	(Estonia) Are Kaurit; Jürgen Jakk	391
2005	(Netherlands) Daniël Willemsen (Belgium) Sven Verbrugge	478	(Latvia) Kristers Serģis; Kaspars Stupelis	440	(Latvia) Māris Rupeiks; Haralds Kurpnieks	317
2006	(Netherlands) Daniël Willemsen (Belgium) Sven Verbrugge	341	(Russia) Evgeny Scherbinin; Sergei Sosnovskikh	258	(Germany) Marko Happich (Switzerland) Meinrad Schelbert	243
2007	(Netherlands) Daniël Willemsen (Switzerland) Reto Grütter	375	(Belgium) Jan Hendrickx; Tim Smeuninx	286	(Latvia) Kristers Serģis; Kaspars Stupelis	242
2008	(Netherlands) Daniël Willemsen (Switzerland) Reto Grütter	531	(Latvia) Kristers Serģis; Kaspars Stupelis	434	(Belgium) Jan Hendrickx; Tim Smeuninx	421
2009	(Belgium) Joris Hendrickx (Latvia) Kaspars Liepiņš	483	(Belgium) Jan Hendrickx; Tim Smeuninx	465	(Latvia) Jānis Daiders; Lauris Daiders	418
2010	(Netherlands) Daniël Willemsen; Gertie Eggink	556	(Belgium) Joris Hendrickx (Latvia) Kaspars Liepiņš	547	(Belgium) Jan Hendrickx; Tim Smeuninx	464
2011	(Netherlands) Daniël Willemsen (Belgium) Sven Verbrugge	487	(Latvia) Jānis Daiders; Lauris Daiders	478	(Belgium) Jan Hendrickx; Tim Smeuninx	405
2012	(Netherlands) Daniël Willemsen; Kenny van Gaalen	452	(Netherlands) Etienne Bax (Latvia) Kaspars Stupelis	447	(Belgium) Ben Adriaenssen; Sven Verbrugge	385
2013	(Belgium) Ben Adriaenssen (Netherlands) Ben van den Bogaart	610	(Netherlands) Etienne Bax (Latvia) Kaspars Stupelis	513	(Belgium) Jan Hendrickx (Latvia) Elvijs Mucenieks	442
2014	(Belgium) Ben Adriaenssen (Netherlands) Ben van den Bogaart	420	(Netherlands) Etienne Bax (Latvia) Kaspars Stupelis	402	(United Kingdom) Stuart Brown; Josh Chamberlain	317
2015	(Netherlands) Etienne Bax (Latvia) Kaspars Stupelis	675	(France) Valentin Giraud; Nicolas Musset	579	(Belgium) Jan Hendrickx (Netherlands) Ben van den Bogaart	579

- Passengers in italics.

== Statistics ==
=== GP winning drivers ===
The number of races has historically. This leads to the Grand Prix winners table being somewhat in favour of the more recent riders, early seasons having had only a small number of races.

Every race weekend now consists of two races, with the best team out of the two becoming the week ends Grand Prix winner. In some earlier seasons, race weekends were also staged in three separate races.

Listed are all Grand Prix winning drivers up until the end of the 2015 season:

**GP Wins**
**Rider**	**Country**	**Wins**
**Daniël Willemsen**	Netherlands	88
Kristers Serģis	Latvia	46
Robert Grogg	Switzerland	30
**Etienne Bax**	Netherlands	26
Hansi Bächtold	Switzerland	22
Ton van Heugten	Netherlands	19
Klaus Weinmann	Germany	16
Andreas Fuhrer	Switzerland	15
Emil Bollhalder	Switzerland	13
**Ben Adriaenssen**	Belgium	12
Benny Janssen	Netherlands	11
Eimbert Timmermans	Netherlands	10
Joris Hendrickx	Belgium	9
Bruno Schneider	Austria	8
Josef Brockhausen	Germany	8
August Muller	Netherlands	8
Christoph Hüsser	Switzerland	8
Nick Thompson	United Kingdom	7
Reinhard Böhler	Germany	7
**Jan Hendrickx**	Belgium	7
Henrik Söderqvist	Sweden	6
Rikkus Lubbers	Netherlands	6
Michael Garhammer	Germany	6
Walter Netterscheid	Germany	6
Alois Wenninger	Germany	6
Lorenz Haller	Switzerland	5
Gilles Mecene	France	5
Cor den Biggelaar	Netherlands	5
Jacky Janssen	Netherlands	5
Māris Rupeiks	Latvia	4
Jānis Daiders	Latvia	3
Wolfgang Kuhn	Germany	4
Marko Happich	Germany	3
Jan ten Thije	Netherlands	3
Tore Stromberg	Sweden	3
Parmo Nielsen	Denmark	3
Karl Fussenegger	Austria	3
Martin Gölz	Germany	3
Wilfred van Werven	Netherlands	3
**Valentin Giraud**	France	3
Herbert Huwyler	Switzerland	2
Eddy Ramon	Belgium	2
Terry Good	United Kingdom	2
Jan Bakens	Netherlands	2
Paul Millard	United Kingdom	2
Dietmar Schmid	Germany	2
Gunther Goovaerts	Belgium	2
Benoit Beaumont	France	2
**Stuart Brown**	United Kingdom	1
**Vaclav Rozehnal**	Czech Republic	1
Alois de Kort	Belgium	1
Pierre Borms	Belgium	1
Herbert Bohren	Switzerland	1
Doug Fox	United Kingdom	1
Daniel van Bellinghen	Belgium	1
Kurt Engelhart	Germany	1
Rijn van Gastel	Netherlands	1
Andreas Lenherr	Liechtenstein	1
Marco Bens	Netherlands	1
Josef Brustmann	Germany	1
Chris Etheridge	United Kingdom	1
Fritz Gerber	Switzerland	1
Eric Aronsson	Sweden	1
Anatoli Sibertsev	(Soviet Union) USSR	1
David Barat	France	1

Denotes World Champions – European Champions – FIM-Cup winners

- **Bold** denotes driver was active in the 2015 World Championship.
- Results are for 1971 to 2015.

== Countries ==
The overwhelming majority of Grand Prix winners hail from the five countries that also have provided a World Champion. These five also sit at the top of the list of countries having held Grand Prix, alongside France and the United Kingdom, who are without a World Championship:

=== GP wins per country ===
Driver GP Wins
Country	Wins
Netherlands	188
Switzerland	98
Germany	63
Latvia	53
Belgium	36
United Kingdom	14
Austria	11
France	11
Sweden	10
Denmark	3
Czech Republic	1
(Soviet Union) USSR	1

- Results are for 1971 to 2015.

=== GP's held by country ===
GP Locations
Country	GP's	Seasons	Canceled GP's
Germany	70	1971–2015	—
France	65	1971–2015	—
Netherlands	49	1971–2015	—
Belgium	46	1971–86, 1988–2013, 2015	2014
Switzerland	37	1971, 1973–81, 1983–96, 1999–2000, 2009, 2011–15	1972, 1982
Latvia	28	1996–2015	—
(United Kingdom) Great Britain	27	1972–89, 1991–93, 1998–2001, 2010	—
Czech Republic	20	1988–97, 1999, 2001–02, 2008, 2012–15	—
Austria	19	1971–89	1990
Estonia	18	1997–2004, 2008–2015	—
Italy	17	1974–76, 1979–80, 1982–90, 2004, 2008, 2010	—
Denmark	16	1971–73, 1975–76, 1978–82, 1984, 1989, 2008–11	1974, 1977
Sweden	15	1971–78, 1981, 1983, 1985, 1987, 2000–02	—
Spain	10	1982–84, 1986–88, 2003–05, 2015	—
Ukraine	8	1992, 2001, 2008–11, 2013	—
Finland	8	1984–91	—
Portugal	7	1986–92	1974
Bulgaria	4	2002–05	—
Croatia	4	2004–07	—
Russia	4	2009–12	—
Poland	3	2009–11	—
Norway	3	1971–73	—
Slovenia	2	1992–93	—
Greece	2	1998–99	—
Northern Ireland	2	1979–80	1981
Belarus	1	2000	—
Romania	1	2003	—
San Marino	1	1986	1978
(Soviet Union) USSR	1	1971	—
(Socialist Federal Republic of Yugoslavia) Yugoslavia	1	1980	1991

- GP's figures are for 1971 to 2015.

Countries with GP's in 2015

== GP Locations ==
In the history of the competition from 1971 to 2015, races have been held in 157 different locations, with Malpartida de Cáceres and Stelpe having been new additions for 2015:

Locations
Venue	Country	GP's
Ķegums	Latvia	21
Feldkirch	Austria	19
Betekom	Belgium	18
Rudersberg	Germany	17
Strassbessenbach	Germany	13
Wohlen	Switzerland	12
Brou	France	10
Chernivtsi	Ukraine	10
Kiviõli	Estonia	9
Oss	Netherlands	9
Castelnau-de-Lévis	France	8
Erbach	Germany	8
Genk	Belgium	8
Neeroeteren	Belgium	8
Ouběnice	Czech Republic	8
Roggenburg	Switzerland	8
Cēsis	Latvia	7
Frauenfeld	Switzerland	7
Pernes-les-Fontaines	France	7
Holbæk	Denmark	6
Oldebroek	Netherlands	6
Rothenthurm	Switzerland	6
Salo	Finland	6
Slagelse	Denmark	6
Beenham	United Kingdom	5
Dardon Guegnon	France	5
Jaanikese	Estonia	5
Jinín	Czech Republic	5
Lacapelle-Marival	France	5
Langrish	United Kingdom	5
Saku	Estonia	5
Varberg	Sweden	5
Bielstein	Germany	4
Cingoli	Italy	4
Frome	United Kingdom	4
Halle	Netherlands	4
Holzgerlingen	Germany	4
Kramolín	Czech Republic	4
Lochem	Netherlands	4
Makkinga	Netherlands	4
Markelo	Netherlands	4
Newbury	United Kingdom	4
Pfluckoff	Germany	4
Plomion	France	4
Reutlingen	Germany	4
Rijkevorsel	Belgium	4
Saint-Jean-d'Angle	France	4
Schopfheim	Germany	4
Zabok	Croatia	4
Águeda	Portugal	3
Baugé	France	3
Canada Heights	United Kingdom	3
Eidsvoll	Norway	3
Fermo	Italy	3
Gdańsk	Poland	3
Guadalajara	Spain	3
Iffendic	France	3
Kamensk	(Russia)	3
Lierop	Netherlands	3
Maribor	Slovenia	3
Sevlievo	Bulgaria	3
Talavera	Spain	3
Varsseveld	Netherlands	3
Alqueidão	Portugal	2
Beuern	Germany	2
Bra	Italy	2
Charlottedal	Denmark	2
Château-du-Loir	France	2
Halstead	United Kingdom	2
Hove	Belgium	2
Huskvarna	Sweden	2
Kallithea Elassonos	Greece	2
Kamp-Lintfort	Germany	2
Lichtenvoorde	Netherlands	2
Nepomuk	Czech Republic	2
Penza	Russia	2
Streatley	United Kingdom	2
Tägerig	Switzerland	2
Tarare	France	2
Vesoul	France	2

Locations
Venue	Country	GP's
Whitehead	Northern Ireland	2
Zaltbommel	Netherlands	2
Aalborg	Denmark	1
Ambérieu-en-Bugey	France	1
Apeldoorn	Netherlands	1
Arco	Italy	1
Asti	Italy	1
Aufenau	Germany	1
Baldassorona	San Marino	1
Beerzelberg	Belgium	1
Borgloon	Belgium	1
Bourg-Bruche	France	1
Broc	Switzerland	1
Bucharest	Romania	1
Casale Monferrato	Italy	1
Corseul	France	1
Cortelha	Portugal	1
Cussac	France	1
Eke	Belgium	1
Erlangen	Germany	1
Ernée	France	1
Farleigh Castle	United Kingdom	1
Flawil	Switzerland	1
Gallarate	Italy	1
Gendt	Netherlands	1
Gerstetten	Germany	1
Grazzolina	Italy	1
Hechtel	Belgium	1
Hedemora	Sweden	1
Heinola	Finland	1
Hirsingue	France	1
Ibiza	Spain	1
Imatra	Finland	1
Jauer	Germany	1
Kassel	Germany	1
Kyiv	Ukraine	1
Landskrona	Sweden	1
Laveno-Mombello	Italy	1
Loket	Czech Republic	1
Malmö	Sweden	1
Malpartida de Cáceres	Spain	1
Mantua	Italy	1
Meyel	Netherlands	1
Mill	Netherlands	1
Morón de la Frontera	Spain	1
Mors	Denmark	1
Mölndal	Sweden	1
Niederwil	Switzerland	1
Niort	France	1
Nismes	Belgium	1
Odenheim	Germany	1
Reek	Netherlands	1
Rhenen	Netherlands	1
Sabadell	Spain	1
Saedd	Denmark	1
Saint-Mamet	France	1
Sainte-Rosalie	France	1
Salindres	France	1
Samokov	Bulgaria	1
Saxtorp	Sweden	1
Schnaitheim	Germany	1
Schwedt	Germany	1
Setúbal	Portugal	1
Stelpe	Latvia	1
Sturup	Sweden	1
Sucé-sur-Erdre	France	1
Teutschenthal	Germany	1
Thoures	France	1
Tiegemberg	Belgium	1
Tomelilla	Sweden	1
Valkenswaard	Netherlands	1
Vawkavysk	Belarus	1
Viterbo	Italy	1
Villars-sous-Écot	France	1
Vissefjärda	Sweden	1
Waldkirch	Switzerland	1
Warching	Germany	1
Wschowa	Poland	1
Wychen	Netherlands	1
–	–	–

2015 GP Locations

- Figures are for 1971 to 2015.

== Top-ten finishers in the World Championship ==
The drivers (excluding passengers) finishing in the top-ten and their season-by-season finish:

=== 1980 to 1999 ===
The first twenty seasons of the World Championship:

Driver	S	C	T	80	81	82	83	84	85	86	87	88	89	90	91	92	93	94	95	96	97	98	99
(Netherlands) Daniël Willemsen	22	10	16															23	25	12	3	2	1
(Latvia) Kristers Serģis	17	5	12													45	33	22	18	7	1	1	2
(Sweden) Henrik Söderqvist	17	—	4																		16	11	3
(Germany) Klaus Weinmann	16	—	11					18				35	19	6	7	10	13	3	2	5	4	3	4
(Estonia) Are Kaurit	12	—	7														39	24	16	15	15	6	5
(Netherlands) Jacky Janssen	11	—	8												30	29	16	4	4	4	10	7	6
(Germany) Alois Wenninger	9	—	6													15	5	25	21	3	2	4	7
(Estonia) Aivar Korjus	6	—	4																		29	51	8
(Netherlands) Gerton Kops	11	—	4											32		33	27	13	7	10	8	15	9
(Belgium) Peter Steegmans	11	—	5																34	8	5	9	10
(France) Benoit Beaumont	12	—	4													46	31		38	27	19	8	11
(Germany) Martin Gölz	11	—	4									37	18	15	14	35	2	9	3	2		38	12
(Switzerland) Dominik Schoch	8	—	1														54	20	19	22	7	13	13
(France) David Barat	13	—	2												37	20	10	36	17	19	11		14
(Austria) Karl Fussenegger	13	—	6								33	14	12	20	9	17	3	2	6	31	6	10	15
(Netherlands) Wilfred van Werven	9	—	2																	42	17	19	16
(Germany) Marko Happich	17	—	11																	47	26	16	17
(United Kingdom) Shaun Mallows	6	—	1													9	26			38	12	21	18
(United Kingdom) Chris Etheridge	16	—	3							18	28	24	55	26	12	18	7	10	9	16	18	37	19
(Latvia) Māris Rupeiks	16	—	10																			30	21
(Germany) Josef Brustmann	19	—	2									43	15	14	18	7	8	12	14	14	14	12	23
(Switzerland) Wolfgang Kühn	10	—	5												33	16	6	6	5	13	9	5	27
(Russia) Evgeny Scherbinin	12	—	5																				31
(United Kingdom) Stuart Brown	19	—	9																		20	36	32
(Belgium) Geert Devoldere	18	—	1									45	46	38	35	19	22	30	8	21	23	33	33
(Germany) Dietmar Schmid	14	—	2								38	15				11	9	7	11	11	27	35	35
(Netherlands) Eric Schrijver	13	—	2																	26	22	31	39
(Germany) Werner Wittman	13	—	2													36	35	33	12	17	21	17	
(Netherlands) Hugo de Vries	14	—	2					34	13	24	25	11	9	10	24		37	37	28	41	41	29	
(Switzerland) Andreas Fuhrer	12	4	9						27	15	7	3	6	3	11	4	1	1	1	1			
(Belgium) Gunther Gooverts	9	—	2												19	27	11	8	22	6			
(Liechtenstein) Andreas Lenherr	10	—	6							17	41	28	22	7	5	3	4		10	9			
(Switzerland) Christoph Hüsser	10	2	5								5	1	1	19	8	6	17	11	24	24			
(Germany) Michael Garhammer	13	—	5				13	37	22	22	8	7	5	2		8	41	18	36	29			
(Netherlands) Marco Bens	6	—	1											11	13	22	15	5	20				
(Netherlands) Eimbert Timmermans	8	2	5							16	17	5	3	5	1	1			26				
(Switzerland) Hans Rudolf Herren	16	—	2	19	28	14	20	15	9	9	22	22	23	23	37	14	19	19	37				
(Germany) Walter Netterscheid	13	—	6			17	18	14	14	4	9	2	8	4	4	32	32	21					
(Netherlands) Jan Bakens	13	—	2	13	3	11	9	22	17	28		17	17	25	26	31	42						
(Belgium) Eddy Ramon	4	—	3										14	8	2	2							
(France) Gilles Mecene	9	—	4		23			31	25		21	6	4	12	3	5							
(Switzerland) Teddy Morf	3	—	1											13	10	34							
(Netherlands) Benny Janssen	10	1	9			30	10	8	6	6	4	10	2	1	6								
(Denmark) Parmo Nielsen	8	—	3				28		18	7	16	4	11	9	17								
(Switzerland) Hubert Huwyler	9	—	6		14	18	25	5	10	5	10	9	7										
(Netherlands) Ton van Heugten	10	1	7	4	1	3	15	2	3	3	36	12	10										
(United Kingdom) Paul Millar	7	—	3				12	10	5	14	6	21	29										
(Netherlands) August Muller	9	—	7	20	8	6	4	23	2	2	2	8											
(Switzerland) Thomas Graf	6	—	1			31	16	12	7		14	13											
(Netherlands) Rijn van Gastel	9	—	5	21	10	8	11	9	26	10	3	19											
(United Kingdom) Doug Fox	9	—	2	11	15	4	23	16	4	13	27	29											
(Netherlands) Toni Bens	8	—	1	9	13	23		17	21	27	24	31											
(Switzerland) Hansi Bächtold	8	4	8	2	7	7	6	1	1	1	1												
(Switzerland) Heinz Franz	4	—	1					26	20	8	12												
(Denmark) Sven Larsen	5	—	1	16	9	16		32		26													
(Germany) Kurt Engelhard	4	—	1			10	22	11		29													
(Germany) Reinhard Böhler	6	1	5	1	5	19	3	3	8														
(United Kingdom) Terry Good	5	—	3	8	18	15	7	6	11														
(Belgium) Daniel van Bellinghem	6	—	4	10	12	9	8	4	12														
(Netherlands) Mari Bens	4	—	2			27	5	7	16														
(Switzerland) Robert Grogg	5	—	3	5	6	5	19	36															
(Switzerland) Emil Bollhalder	4	—	3	24	4	1	1																
(Germany) Josef Brockhausen	4	—	4	6	2	2	2																
(Austria) Bruno Schneider	1	—	1	3																			
(Netherlands) Cor den Biggelaar	1	—	1	7																			

=== 2000 to present ===
The seasons of the World Championship since 2000:

Driver	S	C	T	00	01	02	03	04	05	06	07	08	09	10	11	12	13	14	15	16
(Netherlands) Etienne Bax	9	1	8								21	10	8	4	5	2	2	2	1	
(France) Valentin Giraud	6	—	3											38	13	6	13	5	2	
(Belgium) Jan Hendrickx	14	—	13			22	6	9	7	5	2	3	2	3	3	5	3	4	3	
(Netherlands) Daniël Willemsen	22	10	16	2	2	2	1	1	1	1	1	1	5	1	1	1	21	9	4	
(United Kingdom) Stuart Brown	19	—	9	29	20	6	5	5	9	8	24	17	9	13	17	13	6	3	5	
(Netherlands) Koen Hermans	2	—	1															15	6	
(Belgium) Marvin Vanluchene	2	—	1															19	7	
(Switzerland) Andy Bürgler	13	—	5			43	25	14	20	6	4	26		18	14	10	8	16	8	
(Czech Republic) Vaclav Rozehnal	14	—	8			26	15	21	11	9	5	7	6	11	11	7	5	8	9	
(Netherlands) Gert van Werven	4	—	1													26	17	12	10	
(Belgium) Jason van Daele	5	—	2												42	12	10	7	11	
(Belgium) Ben Adriaenssen	7	2	5										18	6	6	3	1	1	14	
(United Kingdom) Daniel Millard	8	—	2									35	17	14	10	15	32	10	16	
(Czech Republic) Tomas Cermak	11	—	2				46	24	17	18	9	37	10	7	18	20			17	
(Netherlands) Marcel Willemsen	15	—	2		19	16	32	13	13	10	17	11	24	25	21	8	39	20	20	
(Netherlands) Jan Visscher	9	—	1								39	30	15	10	12	21	12	17	24	
(Sweden) Philip Stenborg	5	—	2												33	19	9	6	46	
(Netherlands) Jarno van den Boomen	7	—	1					26	6	14	16	22				35		26		
(Latvia) Jānis Daiders	10	—	6					39	24	12	10	8	3	8	2	11	4			
(Latvia) Māris Rupeiks	16	—	10	17	12	14	9	16	3	4	6	6	7	5	4	9	7			
(Sweden) Henrik Söderqvist	17	—	3	5	3	7	26	17	26	23	11	20	19	23	19	14	11			
(Belgium) Joris Hendrickx	10	1	8				42	11	8	7	8	4	1	2	9	4				
(Germany) Marko Happich	17	—	11	10	9	5	7	2	5	3	7	5	4	15	8	18				
(Russia) Evgeny Scherbinin	12	—	5	18	13	9	11	4	4	2	18		30	20	7					
(France) Baptiste Bigand	6	—	1						48	43	35	25	33	9						
(Belgium) Peter Steegmans	11	—	5	21	8						40	16	11	12						
(Belgium) Nicky Pulinx	6	—	1					20	16	13	14	9	12							
(Netherlands) Eric Schrijver	13	—	2	15	18	12	10	6	12	17		14	37							
(Latvia) Kristers Serģis	17	5	12	1	1	1	2	7	2	19	3	2								
(Austria) Bertram Martin	7	—	1		46	24	14	10		21	20	32								
(Germany) Werner Wittman	13	—	2			17	12	8	10	31	32									
(Germany) Josef Brustmann	19	—	2	12	17	19	20	18	18	11										
(Belgium) Geert Devoldere	18	—	1	43	29	37	24		28	30										
(France) David Barat	13	—	2	8	14	38	27		21											
(Germany) Dietmar Schmid	14	—	2	35			47	38	42											
(Estonia) Are Kaurit	12	—	7	7	5	4	4	3												
(France) Benoit Beaumont	12	—	4	13	10	10	8	15												
(Belgium) Gunther Gooverts	9	—	2			28	18	25												
(Netherlands) Wilfred van Werven	9	—	2	26	11	3	3	32												
(Estonia) Aivar Korjus	6	—	4	9	6	8														
(Germany) Klaus Weinmann	16	—	11	3	7	11														
(Netherlands) Jacky Janssen	11	—	8	6	4															
(United Kingdom) Chris Etheridge	16	—	3	23	21															
(Netherlands) Gerton Kops	11	—	4	11	22															
(Germany) Alois Wenninger	9	—	6	4																
(Switzerland) Dominik Schoch	8	—	1	14																
(Switzerland) Wolfgang Kühn	10	—	5	20																

=== Key ===
1	World Champions
2	Runners-up
3	Third placed
4 – 10	Drivers in the top ten placed fourth to tenth
S	No. of Seasons in the WC
C	No. of World Championships won
T	No. of top-ten finishes in the WC
