= Hansi Bächtold =

Swiss sidecross rider

- Nationality: Switzerland
- Born: August 21, 1956 (age 70)
Motorcycle racing career statistics
Sidecarcross World Championship
Active years	1977 - 1987
Manufacturers	Yamaha-Wasp (1977) Yamaha-EML (1978-82) Jumbo-EML (1983-87)
Championships	(4) 1984 – 1987
1987 championship position	1st
Starts / Wins / Podiums / Poles / F. laps / Points; 167 / 42 / 74 / / / 1,656

Hansi Bächtold (born 21 August 1956), is a Swiss retired sidecarcross rider and four-time Sidecarcross World Champion, having won the competition from 1984 to 1987, together with his passenger Fritz Fuß. The duo became the first-ever combination to win the competition four times in a row, a feat later repeated by the Swiss team of Andreas Fuhrer and Adrian Käser and surpassed by Dutch rider Daniël Willemsen with six consecutive titles.

Apart from his four World Championship triumphs, Bächtold has also won the Swiss national sidecarcross championship on five occasions, in 1979, 1981, 1984, 1986 and 1987.

== Biography ==
Bächtold made his sidecarcross debut in the Swiss championship in 1977 with passenger Wolf Kieser, coming sixth overall. They also raced in one event in the European Championship, the predecessor of the World Championship and scored a ninth place in the second race of the German Grand Prix.

The following season was not very successful for Bächtold, only finishing 15th in the Swiss championship and 14th in Europe and using three different passengers during the season. A highlight however was a second place at the second race of the Swiss GP.

From 1979, Bächtold used Hugo Jung as his passenger, a partnership that would last for three seasons. The new combination was instantly successful in the Swiss championship, taking out the title in 1979 and 1981 and finishing runners-up in between. The two titles were achieved against the strong competition of Robert Grogg and Emil Bollhalder, two of Europe's best riders at the time. In Europe the pair came tenth in 1979. The following season, in a competition now renamed World Championship, the pair finished runners-up to the first World Champions, Germans Reinhard Böhler and Siegfried Müller. The 1981 season was not as successful with the team only finishing seventh.

The 1982 season saw Bächtold use three different passengers again, eventually settling on Fritz Fuß. Success during that season was limited with a fourth place overall in Switzerland and a seventh in the World Championship. The 1983 season, now with Fuß as permanent passenger, saw improvement with a runners-up finish in the national and a sixth place in the World Championship.

From 1984 to 1987, the combination of Bächtold and Fuß dominated the World Championship and, almost equally, the Swiss championship. In 1984, they beat the 1981 World Champions Ton van Heugten and Frits Kiggen from the Netherlands by 58 points. The following three years, August Muller and Henk van Heek, also from the Netherlands, came second each year. The closest the Dutch combination came to the Swiss World champions was in 1987 when they lost by 36 points.

In Switzerland, at the same time, the pair won the national title three times in four seasons. Only in 1985 did they miss out, finishing runners-up to Thomas Graf and Markus von Rotz by six points. It was the only time between 1982 and 1988 that the Swiss champions were not also the World Champions.

At the end of the 1987 season, Bächtold retired from national and international sidecarcross racing, as did Fuß, who had spent his entire career with Bächtold. The main reason behind Bächtold's retirement was financial. He had to give up his job as a car mechanic to be able to race while not receiving any financial reward for racing.

== Racing record ==
=== Sidecarcross World Championship ===
The competition which was to become the Sidecarcross World Championship in 1980 originated as the FIM Cup in 1971 and was renamed to European championship in 1975. Hansi Bächtold's results in these competitions were:

Season	Passenger(s)	Equipment	Position	Points	Races	Wins	Second	Third
1977	Wolf Kieser	Yamaha-Wasp	32	2	2	—	—	—
1978	Hugo Jung Johan Wenger	Yamaha-EML	14	14	4	—	1	—
1979	Hugo Jung	Yamaha-EML	10	56	18	—	1	—
1980	Hugo Jung	Yamaha-EML	2	148	16	4	2	2
1981	Hugo Jung	Yamaha-EML	7	57	12	—	—	2
1982	Fritz Meyer Sies Hurkmans Fritz Fuß	Yamaha-EML	7	56	12	—	—	4
1983	Fritz Fuß	Jumbo-EML	6	77	17	—	2	—
1984	Fritz Fuß	Jumbo-EML	1	290	22	5	6	3
1985	Fritz Fuß	Jumbo-EML	1	290	20	12	1	—
1986	Fritz Fuß	Jumbo-EML	1	389	24	14	1	2
1987	Fritz Fuß	Jumbo-EML	1	277	22	7	3	2
	Overall 1977 - 1987			1,656	167	42	17	15

== Honours ==
=== World Championship ===
- Champions: (4) 1984, 1985, 1986, 1987
- Runners-up: (1) 1980

=== National Championships ===
- Swiss national championship:
  - Champions: (5) 1979, 1981, 1984, 1986, 1987
  - Runners-up: (3) 1980, 1983, 1985

Sporting positions
Preceded by Emil Bollhalder	Sidecarcross World Champion; 1984 - 1987	Succeeded by Christoph Hüsser
Preceded by Robert Grogg	Swiss national sidecarcross champion 1979	Succeeded by Robert Grogg
Preceded by Robert Grogg	Swiss national sidecarcross champion 1981	Succeeded by Emil Bollhalder
Preceded by Emil Bollhalder	Swiss national sidecarcross champion 1984	Succeeded by Thomas Graf
Preceded by Thomas Graf	Swiss national sidecarcross champion 1986 - 1987	Succeeded by Christoph Hüsser
