= Sidecarcross World Championship =

European Motorcar competition

- Category: Motocross
- Country: International
- Inaugural season: 1980
- Teams: 2025 Teams
- Teams' champion: (Belgium) Marvin Vanluchene (Belgium) Glenn Janssens
- Official website: fimsidecarcross.com

The Sidecar Motocross World Championship is an annual event, first held in 1980. It is organized by the Fédération Internationale de Motocyclisme (FIM). Before 1980, a European competition was held from 1971 onwards.

== History ==
The sport is predominantly amateur, with only the top-riders, like former world champions Ben Adriaenssen, Daniël Willemsen and Etienne Bax being professional.

The Sidecarcross World Championship, first held in 1980 and organised by the Fédération Internationale de Motocyclisme, is an annual competition. All races, manufacturers and the vast majority of riders in the competition are in and from Europe. Sidecarcross is similar to motocross except that the teams consist of two riders, a driver and a passenger. Races are held on the same tracks as solo motocross but the handling of the machines differs as sidecars do not lean. The majority of physical work in the sport is carried out by the passenger, who speeds up the sidecarcross in corners by leaning out. The coordination between the driver and the passenger is therefore of highest importance. Record world champion Daniël Willemsen estimated that the passenger's contribution to the success of a team is at least 50%, and that not enough credit is given to the passenger.

The sport is especially popular in Eastern Europe. Parallel to the riders' competition, a manufacturers' championship is also held.

While usually a male-dominated sport, the 2014 season saw the participation of a woman driver in the competition. Belgian Sabrina van Calster scored two points in the first race of the Swiss Grand Prix.

The 2016 season champions were the Belgian–Dutch combination Jan Hendrickx and Ben van den Bogaart, having won their first World Championship together. Also van den Bogaart previously had won two World Championships as the passenger of Ben Adriaenssen.

== Overview ==
The World Championship in sidecar motocross is held annually form the European spring to autumn. The fourteen Grands Prix of the 2019 season were held in nine countries: Belgium (two events), Netherlands (two events), Germany (two events), France (two events), Switzerland, Czech Republic, Estonia, Spain, Ukraine, and Latvia. The 2015 season, in comparison to the 2014 season, had five Grands Prix added. Germany increased its number of Grands Prix from two to three while Latvia increased theirs from one to two. The Belgian Grand Prix was re-added to the season after having been cancelled in 2014 because of bad weather. Ukraine, who had its 2014 Grand Prix cancelled because of the political situation in the country, originally received a Grand Prix for 2015 but this event was removed from the calendar again. Switzerland also had its number of Grands Prix increased from one to two while Spain had not been on the calendar since 2005.

=== Participants by country ===
In the 2015 season, 56 teams finished in the points in the competition, with the drivers hailing from fourteen European nations. Of these, the drivers for the Netherlands were the most populous, having nine drivers in the competition, followed by Belgium with eight and Estonia with seven. In the last six seasons, drivers from the following countries took part in the competition and earned points:

Country	2010	2011	2012	2013	2014	2015
Netherlands	10	9	9	11	13	9
Belgium	9	7	6	6	9	8
Estonia	6	6	7	6	4	7
Germany	8	6	4	5	6	6
Czech Republic	2	3	3	3	4	6
Switzerland	2	1	2	3	4	6
United Kingdom	8	9	7	8	5	4
France	5	3	3	4	5	4
Finland	2	1	0	0	2	1
Sweden	3	3	3	3	1	1
Austria	1	2	0	2	1	1
Lithuania	3	1	2	1	1	1
Latvia	3	3	3	4	0	1
Russia	5	6	4	0	0	1
Italy	1	0	0	0	1	0
Ukraine	2	2	1	0	0	0
Belarus	0	1	0	0	0	0
Denmark	1	0	0	0	0	0
Moldova	1	0	0	0	0	0
Overall	72	63	54	56	56	56

• Drivers who took part in the competition but did not win points are not captured here as the FIM does not list them in the end-of-season pilots' ranking.

== Calendar ==
The Grand Prix calendar for the 2019 season:

GP	Date	Location	Race Winners	Grand Prix Winner	Source
1	7 April	(Belgium) Lommel	(Netherlands) Julian Veldman/ (Belgium) Glenn Janssens	(Belgium) Marvin Vanluchene / (Netherlands) Ben van den Bogaart	Result
1	7 April	(Belgium) Lommel	(Netherlands) Etienne Bax / (Latvia) Kaspars Stupelis	(Belgium) Marvin Vanluchene / (Netherlands) Ben van den Bogaart	Result
2	14 April	(Spain) Talavera de la Reina	(France) Valentin Giraud / (Germany) Andres Haller	(Netherlands) Koen Hermans / (France) Nicolas Musset	Result
2	14 April	(Spain) Talavera de la Reina	(Netherlands) Koen Hermans / (France) Nicolas Musset	(Netherlands) Koen Hermans / (France) Nicolas Musset	Result
3	22 April	(Netherlands) Oldebroek	(Netherlands) Etienne Bax / (Latvia) Kaspars Stupelis	(Netherlands) Etienne Bax / (Latvia) Kaspars Stupelis	Result
3	22 April	(Netherlands) Oldebroek	(Netherlands) Etienne Bax / (Latvia) Kaspars Stupelis	(Netherlands) Etienne Bax / (Latvia) Kaspars Stupelis	Result
4	12 May	(Czech Republic) Kramolín	(Belgium) Marvin Vanluchene / (Netherlands) Ben van den Bogaart	(Belgium) Marvin Vanluchene / (Netherlands) Ben van den Bogaart	Result
4	12 May	(Czech Republic) Kramolín	(Netherlands) Koen Hermans / (France) Nicolas Musset	(Belgium) Marvin Vanluchene / (Netherlands) Ben van den Bogaart	Result
5	19 May	(Ukraine) Kyiv	(Netherlands) Etienne Bax / (Latvia) Kaspars Stupelis	(Netherlands) Etienne Bax / (Latvia) Kaspars Stupelis	Result
5	19 May	(Ukraine) Kyiv	(Netherlands) Etienne Bax / (Latvia) Kaspars Stupelis	(Netherlands) Etienne Bax / (Latvia) Kaspars Stupelis	Result
6	2 June	(France) Plomion	(France) Valentin Giraud / (Germany) Andres Haller	(France) Valentin Giraud / (Germany) Andres Haller	Result
6	2 June	(France) Plomion	(Netherlands) Etienne Bax / (Latvia) Kaspars Stupelis	(France) Valentin Giraud / (Germany) Andres Haller	Result
7	9 June	(Estonia) Kiviõli	(Netherlands) Koen Hermans / (France) Nicolas Musset	(Netherlands) Koen Hermans / (France) Nicolas Musset	Result
7	9 June	(Estonia) Kiviõli	(Netherlands) Koen Hermans / (France) Nicolas Musset	(Netherlands) Koen Hermans / (France) Nicolas Musset	Result
8	7 July	(Netherlands) Markelo	(Netherlands) Etienne Bax / (Latvia) Kaspars Stupelis	(Netherlands) Etienne Bax / (Latvia) Kaspars Stupelis	Result
8	7 July	(Netherlands) Markelo	(Netherlands) Etienne Bax / (Latvia) Kaspars Stupelis	(Netherlands) Etienne Bax / (Latvia) Kaspars Stupelis	Result
9	14 July	(Germany) Bessenbach	(Netherlands) Etienne Bax / (Latvia) Kaspars Stupelis	(Netherlands) Etienne Bax / (Latvia) Kaspars Stupelis	Result
9	14 July	(Germany) Bessenbach	(Netherlands) Etienne Bax / (Latvia) Kaspars Stupelis	(Netherlands) Etienne Bax / (Latvia) Kaspars Stupelis	Result
10	28 July	(Latvia) Stelpe	(Belgium) Arne Dierckens / (Netherlands) Robbie Bax	(Belgium) Arne Dierckens / (Netherlands) Robbie Bax	Result
10	28 July	(Latvia) Stelpe	(Netherlands) Etienne Bax / (Latvia) Kaspars Stupelis	(Belgium) Arne Dierckens / (Netherlands) Robbie Bax	Result
11	25 August	(Switzerland) Roggenburg	(Netherlands) Etienne Bax / (Latvia) Kaspars Stupelis	(Netherlands) Etienne Bax / (Latvia) Kaspars Stupelis	Result
11	25 August	(Switzerland) Roggenburg	(Netherlands) Etienne Bax / (Latvia) Kaspars Stupelis	(Netherlands) Etienne Bax / (Latvia) Kaspars Stupelis	Result
12	1 September	(Belgium) Gooik	(Belgium) Marvin Vanluchene / (Netherlands) Ben van den Bogaart	(Belgium) Marvin Vanluchene / (Netherlands) Ben van den Bogaart	Result
12	1 September	(Belgium) Gooik	(Belgium) Marvin Vanluchene / (Netherlands) Ben van den Bogaart	(Belgium) Marvin Vanluchene / (Netherlands) Ben van den Bogaart	Result
13	8 September	(France) Geugnon	(Netherlands) Etienne Bax / (Latvia) Kaspars Stupelis	(Belgium) Marvin Vanluchene / (Netherlands) Ben van den Bogaart	Result
13	8 September	(France) Geugnon	(Belgium) Marvin Vanluchene / (Netherlands) Ben van den Bogaart	(Belgium) Marvin Vanluchene / (Netherlands) Ben van den Bogaart	Result
14	15 September	(Germany) Rudersberg	(United Kingdom) Stuart Brown / (United Kingdom) Josh Chamberlain	(United Kingdom) Stuart Brown / (United Kingdom) Josh Chamberlain	Result
14	15 September	(Germany) Rudersberg	(United Kingdom) Stuart Brown / (United Kingdom) Josh Chamberlain	(United Kingdom) Stuart Brown / (United Kingdom) Josh Chamberlain	Result

== History ==
=== Predecessors ===
The history of international competition started with the FIM Cup in 1971, a form of an unofficial European championship, organised by the FIM. The first ever race was held on 25 April 1971 at Pernes-les-Fontaines, France.

From 1975, the competition was officially called the European Championship. From the 1980 season onwards, it carried the title World Championship, even though, in practice, virtually all drivers and passengers are European, except for a small number of riders from the US and Australia, and all races are held in Europe. In its history, there has never been a race outside Europe and majority of the races are in central Europe. The appearance of strong Latvian drivers however has taken races to the Baltic region in the last few years. As of 2007, 24 European countries have hosted GPs, Germany holding the number one spot. Races have also been staged at countries with no strong sidecarcross connections, like Greece, Norway and Northern Ireland.

The competitors in the world championship are mostly amateurs who also compete in their countries' domestic championships. One world champion, Willemsen, also won the Dutch national championship the same year. Most national championships are actually "open" events, in which non-nationals are permitted to compete. Sergis and Rasmanis, for example, also won the German championship in 1998.

The highest number of championships has been won by Daniël Willemsen with ten, with the last of those coming in 2012. The most successful team is Kristers Serģis and Artis Rasmanis with five titles together. The two missed out on a sixth title, when in 1999 they lost by only one point to Daniël Willemsen.

=== History of the World Championship ===
The first edition of the world championship in 1980 saw the only German victory to date with the combination Reinhard Böhler/Siegfried Müller taking out the title. The year after, the championship went to the Netherlands with Ton van Heugten/Frits Kiggen. The next eight seasons, the Swiss riders triumphed. Emil Bollhalder/Karl Büsser won the championship in 1982 and 1983, both times with a narrow margin, 11 points in the first year and 28 in the second. Unlucky runner-up in the three seasons from 1981 to 1983 were the Germans Josef Brockhausen/Hubert Rebele, missing out quite narrowly and retiring in 1983 after the third attempt, as did Bollhalder, but as the world champion.

From 1984 to 1987, four titles went to Hansi Bächtold/Fritz Fuß. Again, there was no luck for the runner-up with the Dutch combination August Muller/Henk van Heek coming second in 1985, 1986 and 1987. In 1986, only 7 points separated winner from second place. Bächtold retired as the new record world champion in 1987.

Christoph Hüsser/Andreas Hüsser won the titles in 1988 and 1989 and continued to race after that until 1996, never coming close to another world championship again. Benny Janssen/Tiny Janssen became the last to win one championship only when the finished on top in 1990, beating the German team Michael Garhammer/Ralf Haas by only 13 points and ending eight years of Swiss domination.

Eimbert Timmermans/Eric Verhagen from the Netherlands beat the Belgian duo Eddy Ramon/Gino Strubbe for the next two titles in 1991 and 92. After this, the world championship returned to Switzerland with Andreas Fuhrer/Adrian Käser equaling the record of four titles in a row from 1993 to 1996 and then retiring from the competition.

The 1997 season marked the beginning of a new era with all previous World Champions having either retired before, or at the end of, the 1996 season. With Kristers Serģis/Artis Rasmanis the 1997 championship went to Latvia for the first time. The tightest race for the championship so far saw them beat the German/Dutch team of Alois Wenninger/Henry van de Wiel by four points. The year after, they won again, this time with a twenty-point gap to Daniël Willemsen/Marcel Willemsen.

1999, saw the tightest race ever when only one point at the end of the season separated the Willemsen brothers from the Latvian title holders. The outcome of the season was not clear until the Willemsen brothers were cleared of having received outside assistance in the second-last race which clinched them the world title, since Artis Rasmanis had lodged a formal complaint. In 2000, Kristers Serģis/Artis Rasmanis came back, beating Daniël Willemsen/Sven Verbrugge by 20 points, the last tight race to date. The Latvians became the new record holder after title number four and five in 2001 and 2002, Willemsen coming second all three seasons.

From 2003 to 2008, Daniël Willemsen made up for his lost titles and won six in a row, becoming the most successful driver so far. He won two each with passengers Kaspars Stupelis, Sven Verbrugge and Reto Grütter.

In 2009, the title went to a Belgian driver for the first time, Joris Hendrickx winning the championship, with his Latvian passenger Kaspars Liepiņš. In 2010, the title returned to the Netherlands with Daniël Willemsen taking out his eighth championship, together with Gertie Eggink as his passenger. In the following year, Willemsen took out another world championship, this time with Sven Verbrugge as his passenger once more, the third for the combination.

Willemsen won a historic tenth World Championship in 2012, finishing five points ahead of Etienne Bax, despite having to exchange his passenger twice. Willemsen used Haralds Kurpnieks as his passenger in the first Grand Prix of the season, Kenny van Gaalen in the following five Grand Prix and Lauris Daiders in the remaining. Kurpnieks suffered a broken wrist in the opening GP while van Gaalen injured his knee in the second French GP, both being thereby sidelined for lengthy periods of time.

The 2013 season marked, with Ben Adriaenssen, the second time that a Belgian driver won the title. Defending champion Daniël Willemsen missed most of the season with injury while 2012 runners-up Etienne Bax came second once more. Adriaenssen and his Dutch passenger Ben van den Bogaart also won the 2014 championship while Etienne Bax came second for third consecutive time. Bax finally won the competition for the first time in 2015, with Kaspars Stupelis as his passenger who had already been World Champion in 2003 and 2004 with Daniël Willemsen.

== Format ==
Every Grand Prix weekend is split into two races, both held on the same day. This means that the 2007 season with its eight Grand Prix had sixteen races. Each race lasts for 30 minutes plus two laps. The two races on a weekend get combined to determine an overall winner. In case of a tie the results of the second race are used to determine the winner. While these overall winners receives no extra WC points, they usually are awarded a special trophy. Race start times are set at 13:30 and 16:00.

Teams consist of a driver and a passenger; however, the drivers can and do exchange passengers during the season, often due to injury. An exchange of passenger does not affect the points a team has won up till then. If a driver uses more than one passenger during his world championship winning season, only the passenger he competed in more than half the meetings with and/or earned more than 50% of his points with will be considered a world champion as well.

Events typically consist of a qualifying competition, held in multiple stages on Saturdays of a race weekend while the two race events are typically held on Sundays. One exception to this rule is Easter weekends, when the races are held on Easter Monday. Race weekends can consist of additional motocross or quart support races, but the FIM stipulates that the World Championship races have priority. Riders have to be provided with at least one 30-minute free practice season, which will be timed. A race can consist of up to 30 starters and the qualifying mode is dependent on the number of entries. With up to 32 entries, it will be held in one group split into two sessions of 30 minutes each. Above 32 entries, the starter field will be sub-divided into two groups through ballot and the current standings. Each qualifying group can consist of up to 30 racers. Should there be more than 60 entries, a pre-qualifying has to be held. Of the riders in the two groups, the top twelve directly qualify for the races. The remaining teams then go to a second-chance qualifying, in which the best six advance. The riders placed seventh and eighth remain in reserve should one of the qualified teams not be able to participate.

The FIM stipulates that all drivers must be of a minimum age of 18 while passengers have to be at least 16 years old to compete, but no older than 50. Riders older than 50 have to provide a certificate of medical fitness to be permitted to compete. The driver has the right to exchange his passenger under certain conditions.

Starting numbers for the season are awarded according to the previous seasons overall finishing position of the driver. Current or former World Champions have however the right to pick any number they wish, except the number one which is reserved for the current World Champion. The top six of the previous season are automatically qualified for the following season, while another ten places are allocated to every national federation.

The competition is open for motor cycles with two-stroke engines from between 350 and 750 cc and four-stroke engines of up to 1,000 cc. Each team is permitted the use of two motorcycles with the possibility of changing machines between races.

The FIM does not permit radio communication between riders and their teams. Outside assistance during the race on the course is not permitted unless it is through race marshals in the interest of safety. Limited repairs in the designated repair zone during the race are permitted.

Historically, the points system has varied and changed over time. In the first three seasons, 1971, 1972 and 1973, points were only awarded for the overall Grand Prix result, after that they were awarded for the individual races. The best ten teams were awarded points with the winner receiving 15 points. This was altered to 15 teams scoring points and the winner receiving 20 from 1984. The current system of 20 teams receiving points and the winner getting 25 was adopted in 2002. Until 1976, only a set number of best results were counted towards the overall standings, since 1977 all results count. Grand Prix were always held in two races except in 1992 and 1993 when three races were held in every Grand Prix. In those two years, races were 20 minutes plus two laps long, after this they reverted to 30 minutes plus two laps again.

The following point systems were used throughout the history of the competition:

The points system from 1971 to 1983:

Place	Points
1	15
2	12
3	10
4	8
5	6

Place	Points
6	5
7	4
8	3
9	2
10	1

The points system from 1984 to 2000:

Place	Points
1	20
2	17
3	15
4	13
5	11
6	10
7	9
8	8

Place	Points
9	7
10	6
11	5
12	4
13	3
14	2
15	1
—	—

The points system in the 2001 season:

Place	Points
1	25
2	20
3	16
4	13
5	11
6	10
7	9
8	8

Place	Points
9	7
10	6
11	5
12	4
13	3
14	2
15	1
16	-

The current points system since 2002:

Place	Points
1	25
2	22
3	20
4	18
5	16
6	15
7	14
8	13
9	12
10	11

Place	Points
11	10
12	9
13	8
14	7
15	6
16	5
17	4
18	3
19	2
20	1

== Finance ==
Prize money and travel reimbursements in the sport are not large, sidecarcross still qualifying mostly as an amateur sport. In the 2009 season for example, every team received Euro 500 as a travel indemnity per race weekend qualified for. Additionally, prize money was paid, with the winner earning €300, the second placed team €250, the third placed team €200. With the prize money gradually dropping off from there, the teams placed twelfth to twentieth still received €50 each. All up, the best possible result would mean a team could take away €1,100 from a race weekend.

== Champions ==
=== Riders ===
The champions since 1971:

- FIM Cup winners (1971 to 1974)

Season	Winners	Engine-Chassis
1971	(Netherlands) Rikus Lubbers / Bart Notten	Norton-Wasp
1972	(Switzerland) Robert Grogg / Gerhard Martinez	Norton-Wasp
1973	(Switzerland) Lorenz Haller / Samuel Haller	Honda-SPP
1974	(Switzerland) Robert Grogg / Andreas Grabner	Norton-Wasp

- European champions (1975 to 1979)

Season	Winners	Engine-Chassis
1975	(Netherlands) Ton van Heugten / Dick Steenbergen	Yamaha-Hagon
1976	(Switzerland) Robert Grogg / Andreas Hüsser	Norton-Wasp
1977	(Switzerland) Robert Grogg / Andreas Hüsser	Norton-Wasp
1978	(Switzerland) Robert Grogg / Andreas Hüsser	Norton-Wasp
1979	(Switzerland) Emil Bollhalder / Roland Bollhalder	Yamaha-EML

- World champions (1980 to present)

Season	Winners	Engine-Chassis
1980	(Germany) Reinhard Böhler / Siegfried Müller	Yamaha-Wasp
1981	(Netherlands) Ton van Heugten / Frits Kiggen	Yamaha-Wasp
1982	(Switzerland) Emil Bollhalder / Karl Büsser	Yamaha-EML
1983	(Switzerland) Emil Bollhalder / Karl Büsser	Yamaha-EML
1984	(Switzerland) Hansi Bächtold / Fritz Fuß	EML/Jumbo-EML
1985	(Switzerland) Hansi Bächtold / Fritz Fuß	EML/Jumbo-EML
1986	(Switzerland) Hansi Bächtold / Fritz Fuß	EML/Jumbo-EML
1987	(Switzerland) Hansi Bächtold / Fritz Fuß	EML/Jumbo-EML
1988	(Switzerland) Christoph Hüsser / Andreas Hüsser	KTM-VMC
1989	(Switzerland) Christoph Hüsser / Andreas Hüsser	KTM-VMC
1990	(Netherlands) Benny Janssen / Tiny Janssen	Honda-EML
1991	(Netherlands) Eimbert Timmermans / Eric Verhagen	Kawasaki-EML
1992	(Netherlands) Eimbert Timmermans / Eric Verhagen	Kawasaki-EML
1993	(Switzerland) Andreas Fuhrer / Adrian Käser	Kawasaki-VMC
1994	(Switzerland) Andreas Fuhrer / Adrian Käser	Kawasaki-VMC
1995	(Switzerland) Andreas Fuhrer / Adrian Käser	Kawasaki-JHR
1996	(Switzerland) Andreas Fuhrer / Adrian Käser	Kawasaki-JHR
1997	(Latvia) Kristers Serģis / Artis Rasmanis	KTM-EML
1998	(Latvia) Kristers Serģis / Artis Rasmanis	Zabel-BSU
1999	(Netherlands) Daniël Willemsen / Marcel Willemsen	Zabel-BSU
2000	(Latvia) Kristers Serģis / Artis Rasmanis	MTH-BSU
2001	(Latvia) Kristers Serģis / Artis Rasmanis	MTH-BSU
2002	(Latvia) Kristers Serģis / Artis Rasmanis	MTH-BSU
2003	(Netherlands) Daniël Willemsen / (Latvia) Kaspars Stupelis	Zabel-VMC
2004	(Netherlands) Daniël Willemsen / (Latvia) Kaspars Stupelis	Zabel-VMC
2005	(Netherlands) Daniël Willemsen / (Belgium) Sven Verbrugge	Zabel-VMC
2006	(Netherlands) Daniël Willemsen / (Belgium) Sven Verbrugge	Zabel-VMC
2007	(Netherlands) Daniël Willemsen / (Switzerland) Reto Grütter	Zabel-VMC
2008	(Netherlands) Daniël Willemsen / (Switzerland) Reto Grütter	Zabel-VMC
2009	(Belgium) Joris Hendrickx / (Latvia) Kaspars Liepiņš	KTM-VMC
2010	(Netherlands) Daniël Willemsen / Gertie Eggink	Zabel-WSP
2011	(Netherlands) Daniël Willemsen / (Belgium) Sven Verbrugge	Zabel-WSP
2012	(Netherlands) Daniël Willemsen / Kenny van Gaalen	Zabel-WSP
2013	(Belgium) Ben Adriaenssen / (Netherlands) Ben van den Bogaart	KTM-WSP
2014	(Belgium) Ben Adriaenssen / (Netherlands) Ben van den Bogaart	Husqvarna-WSP
2015	(Netherlands) Etienne Bax / (Latvia) Kaspars Stupelis	Zabel-WSP
2016	(Belgium) Jan Hendrickx / (Netherlands) Ben van den Bogaart	Husqvarna-WSP
2017	(Netherlands) Etienne Bax / (France) Nicolas Musset	Zabel-WSP
2018	(Belgium) Marvin Vanluchene / (Netherlands) Ben van den Bogaart	Zabel-VMC
2019	(Netherlands) Etienne Bax / (Latvia) Kaspars Stupelis	Zabel-WSP
2021	(Netherlands) Etienne Bax / (France) Nicolas Musset	Zabel-WSP
2022	(Netherlands) Etienne Bax / (Czech Republic) Ondřej Čermák	Husqvarna-WSP
2023	(Belgium) Marvin Vanluchene / (France) Nicolas Musset	Zabel-VMC
2024	(Belgium) Marvin Vanluchene / (Belgium) Glenn Janssens	Zabel-VMC
2025	(Netherlands) Koen Hermans / (Netherlands) Ben van den Bogaart	WSP-Mega

- Passengers are in italics.

=== Manufacturers ===
A sidecar manufacturers' championship has been held since 1980 when the World Championship was introduced. Initially, until 1988, the competition was for engine manufacturers. After a break of no manufacturers' championship, it returned in 1992, now for frame manufacturers:

Season	Manufacturer
1980	Yamaha
1981	Yamaha
1982	Yamaha
1983	Yamaha
1984–87	not awarded
1988	KTM
1989–91	not awarded

Season	Manufacturer
1992	EML
1993	EML
1994	EML
1995	EML
1996	EML
1997	BSU
1998	BSU
1999	not awarded
2000	BSU
2001	BSU
2002	BSU
2003	BSU

Season	Manufacturer
2004	Vruwink MotorCycles
2005	Vruwink MotorCycles
2006	Vruwink MotorCycles
2007	Vruwink MotorCycles
2008	Vruwink MotorCycles
2009	Vruwink MotorCycles
2010	WSP
2011	Vruwink MotorCycles
2012	WSP
2013	WSP
2014	WSP

== Recent seasons ==
The last seasons of the World Championship:

=== 2014 ===
The top ten teams in the final standings were:

Position	Driver / passenger	Equipment	Bike no.	Points
1	(Belgium) Ben Adriaenssen / (Netherlands) Ben van den Bogaart	Husqvarna-WSP	1	420
2	(Netherlands) Etienne Bax / (Latvia) Kaspars Stupelis	Zabel-WSP	2	402
3	(United Kingdom) Stuart Brown / (United Kingdom) Josh Chamberlain	Zabel-WSP	6	317
4	(Belgium) Jan Hendrickx / (Latvia) Elvijs Mucenieks	KTM-WSP	3	315
5	(France) Valentin Giraud / (France) Nicholas Musset	KTM-WHT	100	301
6	(Sweden) Philip Stenborg / (Sweden) Simon Stenborg	Zabel-VMC	9	206
7	(Belgium) Jason van Daele / (Belgium) Tim Smeuninx	Zabel-WHT	10	190
8	(Czech Republic) Vaclav Rozehnal / Jakub Vejchoda	Zabel-VMC	5	181
9	(Netherlands) Daniel Willemsen / (Netherlands) Robbie Bax	Zabel-WSP	111	179
10	(United Kingdom) Daniel Millard / (United Kingdom) Joe Millard	KTM-WHT	32	165

=== 2015 ===
The top ten teams in the final standings:

Position	Driver / passenger	Equipment	Bike No.	Points
1	(Netherlands) Etienne Bax / (Latvia) Kaspars Stupelis	Zabel-WSP	2	675
2	(France) Valentin Giraud / Nicolas Musset	KTM-WHT	5	579
3	(Belgium) Jan Hendrickx / (Netherlands) Ben van den Bogaart (Note: Jan Hendrickx raced with Elvijs Mucenieks as his passenger in the first six Grands Prix of the season. Following the injury to Ben Adriaenssen, Ben van den Bogaart moved across to partner Hendrickx thereafter.)	Husqvarna-WSP	4	579
4	(Netherlands) Daniël Willemsen / Robbie Bax	Zabel-WSP	111	505
5	(United Kingdom) Stuart Brown / Josh Chamberlain	Zabel-WSP	3	468
6	(Netherlands) Koen Hermans / Kenny van Gaalen	Zabel-WSP	15	368
7	(Belgium) Marvin Vanluchene / Eduard Soenens	Zabel-WSP	19	352
8	(Switzerland) Andy Bürgler / Martin Betschart	KTM-VMC	16	350
9	(Czech Republic) Václav Rozehnal / Marek Rozehnal	Zabel-VMC	8	300
10	(Netherlands) Gert van Werven / Peter Beunk	Zabel-WSP	12	279

=== 2016 ===
The top ten teams in the final standings:

Position	Driver / Passenger	Equipment	Bike No.	Points
1	(Belgium) Jan Hendrickx / (Netherlands) Ben van den Bogaart	Husqvarna-WSP	3	424
2	(Belgium) Ben Adriaenssen / (Latvia) Lauris Daiders	Husqvarna-WSP	14	381
3	(United Kingdom) Stuart Brown / Josh Chamberlain	Zabel-WSP	5	377
4	(Netherlands) Etienne Bax / Robbie Bax	Zabel-WSP	82	335
5	(Czech Republic) Tomas Cermak / Ondrej Cermak	MEGA-WSP	17	326
6	(Netherlands) Daniël Willemsen / Peter Beunk	Zabel-WSP	111	266
7	(United Kingdom) Brett Wilkinson / Dan Chamberlain	Zabel-WSP	12	248
8	(Netherlands) Koen Hermans / Kenny van Gaalen	Zabel-VMC	6	243
9	(France) Valentin Giraud / Nicolas Musset	KTM-WHT	2	215
10	(United Kingdom) Nick Jarvis / (Sweden) Christian Nilsson	Husqvarna-WSP	444	211

=== 2017 ===
The top ten teams in the final standings:

Position	Driver / Passenger	Equipment	Bike No.	Points
1	(Netherlands) Etienne Bax / (France) Nicolas Musset	Zabel-WSP	82	567
2	(France) Valentin Giraud / (Latvia) Elvijs Mucenieks	Husqvarna-WHT	9	533
3	(Netherlands) Daniël Willemsen / (Netherlands) Robbie Bax	Zabel-WSP	111	526
4	(United Kingdom) Stuart Brown / (United Kingdom) Josh Chamberlain	Zabel-WSP	3	395
5	(Netherlands) Koen Hermans / (Netherlands) Kenny van Gaalen	Zabel-VMC	8	391
6	(Latvia) Janis Daiders/ (Latvia) Kaspars Stupelis	Zabel-VMC	75	387
7	(Czech Republic) Tomas Cermak / (Czech Republic) Ondrej Cermak	MEGA-WSP	5	375
8	(United Kingdom) Brett Wilkinson / (United Kingdom) Dan Chamberlain	MEGA-WSP	7	322
9	(Belgium) Marvin Vanluchene / (Latvia) Haralds Kurpnieks	Zabel-VMC	11	314
10	(Netherlands) Julian Veldman / (Netherlands) Ben van den Bogaart	Husqvarna-WSP	31	296

=== 2018 ===
The top ten teams in the final standings:

Position	Driver / Passenger	Equipment	Bike No.	Points
1	(Belgium) Marvin Vanluchene / (Netherlands) Ben van den Bogaart	Zabel-VMC	9	510
2	(Netherlands) Koen Hermans / (France) Nicolas Musset	Zabel-WSP	5	429
3	(Netherlands) Etienne Bax / (Latvia) Kaspars Stupelis	Zabel-WSP	82	396
4	(France) Valentin Giraud / (France) Johnny Badair	Husqvarna-WHT	2	334
5	(Netherlands) Julian Veldman / (Belgium) Glenn Janssens	Husqvarna-WHT	10	314
6	(Netherlands) Daniël Willemsen / (Netherlands) Robbie Bax	Zabel-WSP	111	293
7	(Estonia) Kert Varik / (Latvia) Lauris Daiders	Husqvarna-WSP	15	293
8	(United Kingdom) Brett Wilkinson / (United Kingdom) Dan Chamberlain	Zabel-WSP	8	270
9	(Belgium) Davy Sanders / (Germany) Andres Haller	Zabel-WSP	11	245
10	(Belgium) Arne Dierckens / (Netherlands) Luc Rostingt	Zabel-WSP	85	230

=== 2019 ===
The top ten teams in the final standings:

Position	Driver / Passenger	Equipment	Bike No.	Points
1	(Netherlands) Etienne Bax / (Latvia) Kaspars Stupelis	Zabel-WSP	82	604
2	(Belgium) Marvin Vanluchene / (Netherlands) Ben van den Bogaart	Zabel-VMC	1	548
3	(Netherlands) Koen Hermans / (France) Nicolas Musset	Zabel-WSP	2	447
4	(United Kingdom) Stuart Brown / (United Kingdom) Josh Chamberlain	Husqvarna-WHT	888	421
5	(Belgium) Arne Dierckens / (Netherlands) Robbie Bax	Zabel-WSP	10	406
6	(Estonia) Kert Varik / (Latvia) Lauris Daiders	Husqvarna-WSP	7	331
7	(Italy) Zeno Compalati / (France) Bastien Chopin	Zabel-VMC	18	295
8	(United Kingdom) Jake Brown / (United Kingdom) Joe Millard	Zabel-WSP	28	294
9	(Belgium) Davy Sanders / (Finland) Lari Kunnas	Zabel-WSP	9	252
10	(Belgium) Kristof Santermans / (Lithuania) Konstantinas Beleckas	Zabel-WSP	16	203

== See also ==
- List of national sidecarcross champions
