= Fritz Fuß =

Swiss sidecross rider

- Nationality: Switzerland
Motorcycle racing career statistics
Sidecarcross World Championship
Active years	1982 - 1987
Championships	(4) 1984 – 1987
1987 championship position	1st
Starts / Wins / Podiums / Poles / F. laps / Points; / 38 / 59 / / / 1,341

Fritz Fuß is a Swiss retired sidecarcross passenger and four-time Sidecarcross World Champion, having won the competition from 1984 to 1987 as the passenger of Hansi Bächtold. The duo became the first-ever combination to win the competition four times in a row, a feat later repeated by the Swiss team of Andreas Fuhrer and Adrian Käser and surpassed by Dutch rider Daniël Willemsen with six consecutive titles.

Apart from his four World Championship triumphs, Fuß has also won the Swiss national sidecarcross championship on three occasions, in 1984, 1986 and 1987.

== Biography ==
Fuß made his sidecarcross debut in the Swiss championship in 1982, joining Hansi Bächtold in mid-season. Success during that season was limited with a fourth place overall in Switzerland and a seventh in the World Championship. The 1983 season, now with Fuß as permanent passenger, saw improvement with a runners-up finish in the national and a sixth place in the World Championship.

From 1984 to 1987, the combination of Bächtold and Fuß dominated the World Championship and, almost equally, the Swiss championship. In 1984, they beat the 1981 World Champions Ton van Heugten and Frits Kiggen from the Netherlands by 58 points. The following three years August Muller and Henk van Heek, also from the Netherlands, came second each year. The closest the Dutch combination came to the Swiss World champions was in 1987 when they lost by 36 points.

In Switzerland, at the same time, the pair won the national title three times in four seasons. Only in 1985 did they miss out, finishing runners-up to Thomas Graf and Markus von Rotz by six points. It was the only time between 1982 and 1988 that the Swiss champions were not also the World Champions.

At the end of the 1987 season, Bächtold retired from national and international sidecarcross racing despite being only 31 years old, as did Fuß, five years younger, who had spent his entire career with Bächtold. The main reason behind Bächtold's retirement was financial. He had to give up his job as a car mechanic to be able to race while not actually receiving any financial reward for racing. Fuß initially contemplated continuing his sidecarcross career but in the end never competed in the Swiss or World Championship again.

== Honours ==
=== World Championship ===
- Champions: (4) 1984, 1985, 1986, 1987

=== National Championships ===
- Swiss national championship:
  - Champions: (3) 1984, 1986, 1987
  - Runners-up: (1) 1985

Sporting positions
Preceded by Karl Büsser	Sidecarcross World Champion (passenger); 1984 - 1987	Succeeded by Andreas Hüsser
Preceded by Karl Büsser	Swiss national sidecarcross champion (passenger); 1984	Succeeded by Markus von Rotz
Preceded by Markus von Rotz	Swiss national sidecarcross champion (passenger); 1986 - 1987	Succeeded by Andreas Hüsser
