= Emil Bollhalder =

Swiss sidecross rider

- Nationality: Switzerland
Motorcycle racing career statistics
Sidecarcross World Championship
Active years	1974 - 1983
Manufacturers	Norton-Wasp (1974-76) Yamaha-EML (1977-83)
Championships	(2) 1982 – 1983
1983 championship position	1st
Starts / Wins / Podiums / Poles / F. laps / Points; 132 / 22 / 52 / / / 931

Emil Bollhalder is a Swiss retired sidecarcross rider and double Sidecarcross World Champion, having won the competition in 1982 and 1983, together with his passenger Karl Büsser. He has also won the European Champions, the predecessor of the World Championship, in 1979, the last running of the competition.

Apart from his World and European Championship triumphs, Bollhalder has also won the Swiss national sidecarcross championship twice, in 1982 and 1983.

== Biography ==
Bollhalder made his debut in national and international sidecarcross in 1974. He successfully raced in the Swiss championship, finishing runners-up as well as in the FIM-Cup, the predecessor of the European Championship, where he came tenth. In both competitions he used Ruedi Kasper as his passenger.

From 1975, he switched to Roland Bollhalder as his passenger, who he would race with, except for a brief interruption in 1976 until the end of the 1979 season. In this era, the Bollhalder's achieved good results in the Swiss championship but were unable to better Robert Grogg at the time, who dominated the national competition. Internationally, the situation was similar with the duo always finishing high in the top ten of the competition now renamed European Championship. There however, the duo experienced some success in 1979, being able to outscore Robert Grogg and his passenger Andreas Hüsser and winning the last edition of the European Championship.

The first season of the new World Championship proved unsuccessful for Bollhalder, now with new passenger Ruedi Manser. The new team took part in only two events this season and came 24th overall. In the Swiss championship they did not compete at all that year.

For 1981, Bollhalder switched passengers again, now riding with Karl Büsser for the most part of the season. With Büsser, results improved and the new team came second in Switzerland and fourth in the World Championship.

The 1982 and 1983 seasons were dominated by the team of Bollhalder and Büsser, both nationally and internationally. The two won the Swiss championship in both years, as they did the World Championship. In the later, on both occasions, they relegated the German team of Josef Brockhausen and Hubert Rebele to second place, by 62 points in 1982 and 11 points in 1983.

Bollhalder retired from national and international competition after the end of the 1983 season, as did Karl Büsser.

== Racing record ==
=== Sidecarcross World Championship ===
The competition which was to become the Sidecarcross World Championship in 1980 originated as the FIM Cup in 1971 and was renamed to European championship in 1975. Emil Bollhalder's results in these competitions were:.

Season	Passenger(s)	Equipment	Position	Points	Races	Wins	Second	Third
1974	Ruedi Kasper	Norton-Wasp	10	47	8	1	2	—
1975	Roland Bollhalder	Norton-Wasp	5	69	14	2	—	1
1976	Roland Bollhalder Hugo Jung	Norton-Wasp	7	54	12	—	—	—
1977	Roland Bollhalder	Yamaha-EML	6	66	8	2	1	1
1978	Roland Bollhalder	Yamaha-EML	4	116	18	2	3	1
1979	Roland Bollhalder	Yamaha-EML	1	144	16	2	3	5
1980	Ruedi Manser	Yamaha-EML	24	5	4	—	—	—
1981	Karl Büsser Ruedi Manser	Yamaha-EML	4	94	16	2	1	2
1982	Karl Büsser	Yamaha-EML	1	164	16	4	4	2
1983	Karl Büsser	Yamaha-EML	1	172	20	7	3	1
	Overall 1974 - 1983			931	132	22	17	13

== Honours ==
=== World Championship ===
- Champions: (2) 1982, 1983

=== European Championship ===
- Champions: (1) 1979

=== National Championships ===
- Swiss national championship:
  - Champions: (2) 1982, 1983
  - Runners-up: (4) 1974, 1977, 1978, 1981

Sporting positions
Preceded by Ton van Heugten	Sidecarcross World Champion; 1982 - 1983	Succeeded by Hansi Bächtold
Preceded by Robert Grogg	Sidecarcross European Champion; 1979	Succeeded by competition discontinued
Preceded by Hansi Bächtold	Swiss national sidecarcross champion 1982 - 1983	Succeeded by Hansi Bächtold
