= Christoph Hüsser =

Swiss sidecarcross rider (born 1954)

- Nationality: Switzerland
- Born: February 10, 1954 (age 72); Stetten, Aargau
Motorcycle racing career statistics
Sidecarcross World Championship
Active years	1987 - 1996
Manufacturers	KTM-VMC (1987–91) Yamaha-VMC (1992) Zabel-VMC (1993–94) MTH-VMC (1995–96)
Championships	(2) 1988, 1989
1996 championship position	24th
Starts / Wins / Podiums / Poles / F. laps / Points; 168 / 17 / 43 / / / 1,419

Christoph Hüsser (born 10 February 1954) is a Swiss retired sidecarcross rider and dual Sidecarcross World Champion, having won the competition in 1988 and 1989, together with his passenger Andreas Hüsser, his younger twin brother.

Apart from his two World Championship triumphs, Hüsser has also won the Swiss national sidecarcross championship on three occasions, in 1988, 1990 and 1991.

== Biography ==
Hüsser started his motocross career as a solo rider and, unlike his brother Andreas who joint sidecarcross in 1973, he remained in the solo class until 1986, when the two brothers decided to ride together.

Hüsser made his debut in the Swiss national championship in 1987, riding with his brother Andreas as his passenger and finishing second, five points behind compatriots Hansi Bächtold and Fritz Fuß, who had won their fourth consecutive World Championship that year. They also took part in the World Championship where they came fifth overall.

The year after Christoph and Andreas Hüsser won the World Championship, 41 points clear of the German team of Walter Netterscheid and Jürgen Hassold, as well as the Swiss championship, making it their most successful season ever.

The Hüsser's were able to defend their World Championship crown in 1989, this time by 26 points but lost the Swiss championship by seven points to Andreas Fuhrer and Hans Ruedi Stettler.

From 1990 onwards, Hüsser's World Championship results declined but he remained a force in the Swiss national competition. He only took part in three events in the 1990 World Championship, using a different passenger for each Grand Prix. He rode the first event with Andreas Hüsser but then used Flurin Peer and Sies Hurkmans for the next two, finishing 19th overall in the competition. Hüsser however did take out his second Swiss title that season, once more with Andreas Hüsser as his passenger.

In 1991 and 1992, Hüsser rode the World Championship with Adrian Käser, who would later, as passenger of Andreas Fuhrer, win four World titles himself. The new combination finished eighth in the World Championship in 1991 and sixth in 1992. On Swiss level, the two won the title in 1991 and finished third in 1992.

The 1993 World Championship season saw the Hüsser's, Christoph and Andreas, reunited except in two events, where Fritz Witschi served as his passenger. The Hüsser's achieved their last-ever race win in a Grand Prix together that season, in Switzerland, but only came 17th overall. In the Swiss championship, the two came third that season.

In the 1994 season, Hüsser raced the full World Championship program for a last time, coming 11th overall, now with Hans-Rudi Stettler as his passenger. In Switzerland, the duo achieved another third place that year.

Hüsser's last two seasons in the World Championship, 1995 and 1996, saw Hüsser only race three events each year. In both seasons he finished 24th overall, in 1995 with Roger Maurer as his passenger, in 1996 with Conny Johannson. In the Swiss championship he finished third again in 1995 and fifth in 1996.

After the 1996 season, Hüsser retired from both the Swiss and the World Championship, the same year Andreas Fuhrer and Adrian Käser did, the World Champions from 1993 to 1996, bringing to an end the Swiss-dominated era of the Sidecarcross World Championship, which had yielded 12 World Championship for the country in 15 years from 1982 to 1996.

== Personal ==
Christoph Hüsser, together with his twin brother, grew up on his grandparents farm at Stetten, Aargau. After his active career, he started a mobile toilet hire service in 2001.

== Racing record ==
=== Sidecarcross World Championship ===
Christoph Hüsser 's results in the Sidecarcross World Championship were:.

Season	Passenger(s)	Equipment	Position	Points	Races	Wins	Second	Third
1987	Andreas Hüsser	KTM-VMC	5	182	20	1	1	5
1988	Andreas Hüsser	KTM-VMC	1	333	24	7	3	4
1989	Andreas Hüsser	KTM-VMC	1	324	22	8	3	3
1990	Andreas Hüsser Flurin Peer Sies Hurkmans	KTM-VMC	19	36	6	—	—	—
1991	Adrian Käser	KTM-VMC	8	124	18	—	2	1
1992	Adrian Käser	Yamaha-VMC	6	175	25	—	1	2
1993	Andreas Hüsser Fritz Witschi	Zabel-VMC	17	93	21	1	—	—
1994	Ruedi Stettler	Zabel-VMC	11	107	20	—	—	1
1995	Roger Maurer	MTH-VMC	24	23	6	—	—	—
1996	Conny Johannson	MTH-VMC	24	22	6	—	—	—
	Overall 1987 - 1996			1,419	168	17	10	16

== Honours ==
=== World Championship ===
- Champions: (2) 1988, 1989

=== National Championships ===
- Swiss national championship:
  - Champions: (3) 1988, 1990, 1991
  - Runners-up: (2) 1987, 1989

Sporting positions
Preceded by Hansi Bächtold	Sidecarcross World Champion; 1988 - 1989	Succeeded by Benny Janssen
Preceded by Hansi Bächtold	Swiss national sidecarcross champion 1988	Succeeded by Andreas Fuhrer
Preceded by Andreas Fuhrer	Swiss national sidecarcross champion 1990 - 1991	Succeeded by Andreas Lenherr
