= Andreas Hüsser =

Swiss sidecross rider

- Nationality: Switzerland
- Born: February 10, 1954 (age 72); Stetten, Aargau
Motorcycle racing career statistics
Sidecarcross World Championship
| Active years | 1974 - 1993 |
| Championships | (2) 1988, 1989 |
| 1993 championship position | 17th |
Starts / Wins / Podiums / Poles / F. laps / Points; / 54 / 96 / / / 1,934

Andreas Hüsser (born 10 February 1954) is a Swiss retired sidecarcross passenger and dual Sidecarcross World Champion, having won the competition in 1988 and 1989 as passenger of Christoph Hüsser, his older twin brother. He also has three European Championships to his name, the predecessor competition of the World Championship, which he won as passenger of Robert Grogg from 1976 to 1978.

Apart from his two World Championship triumphs, Hüsser has also won the Swiss national sidecarcross championship on five occasions, from 1976 to 1978 with Robert Grogg and in 1988 and 1990 with Christoph Hüsser.

== Biography ==
Unlike his brother Christoph who started his motocross career as a solo rider and, Andreas joint sidecarcross in 1973, while Christoph remained in the solo class until 1986, when the two brothers decided to ride together.

Hüsser made his debut in the Swiss national championship in 1973 when he rode as passenger of Joe Schwegler, with the duo coming fourth overall. The following season, still with Schwegler, he debut in the FIM Cup, the European and World Championships predecessor, coming 15th overall in the FIM-Cup and fourth once more in Switzerland.

In 1975, with the FIM Cup now renamed European Championship, Hüsser rode with Lorenz Haller, finishing 11th in Europe and eighth in the Swiss championship.

From 1976, Hüsser's fortunes greatly improved, now riding with Robert Grogg who had dominated the Swiss championship so far, having won the previous five titles. With his new passenger, Grogg remained as successful in the national championship, winning three more titles together from 1976 to 1978 and losing the 1979 championship by only three points.

It was in Europe however where Grogg greatly improved with Hüsser by his side. Having previously won the FIM-Cup in 1972 with Gerhard Martinez as his passenger Grogg and Hüsser now took out three consecutive European Championships from 1976 to 1978. In this era the duo won 24 out of 42 races. Like in Switzerland, 1979 saw them come second in Europe, too, ending an era of unprecedented success.

Hüsser did not race in 1980 in the competition now renamed Sidecarcross World Championship and Grogg took out the Swiss national title with Alfred Schacher instead. He was back in 1981, again with Grogg, with whom he would race four more seasons until 1984. Grogg and Hüsser were however unable to repeat the pre-1980 results, coming sixth in the World Championship on three occasions and 19th in 1983. At Swiss level the best result in this era was a second place in 1982.

With Grogg's retirement in 1984, Hüsser began racing with Terry Good already during that season and continued on in 1985. In 1986, he raced on the side of Ruedi Herren. An eleventh place in 1985 and a ninth place in 1986 were the overall World Championship results with these riders. While not taking part in the Swiss championship Terry Good did win the British one in 1985 and occasionally had used Hüsser as his passenger there.

A new era began for Hüsser in 1987 when he teamed up with brother Christoph, who he would race with in the World Championship until the end of his career in 1993. In their first season in the Swiss championship the new combination finished second, five points behind compatriots Hansi Bächtold and Fritz Fuß, who had won their fourth consecutive World Championship that year. They also took part in the World Championship where they came fifth overall.

The year after Christoph and Andreas Hüsser won the World Championship, 41 points clear of the German team of Walter Netterscheid and Jürgen Hassold, as well as the Swiss championship, making it their most successful season ever. The Hüsser's were able to defend their World Championship crown in 1989, this time by 26 points but lost the Swiss championship by seven points to Andreas Fuhrer and Hans Ruedi Stettler.

In 1990, Hüsser raced only one Grand Prix event, in Belgium and sat out the 1991 and 1992 seasons altogether. In Switzerland the Hüsser's won one more national title in 1990 but in this combination Andreas Hüsser did not take part in any events in 1991 and 1992, too.

Hüsser's last sidecarcross season came in 1993. He raced once more with Christoph Hüsser and the pair managed one more race win together, in Switzerland, coming 17th overall in the World Championship. In the Swiss championship they came third that season.

== Personal ==
Christoph Hüsser, together with his twin brother, grew up on his grandparents farm at Stetten, Aargau.

== Honours ==
=== World Championship ===
- Champions: (2) 1988, 1989

=== European Championship ===
- Champions: (3) 1976, 1977, 1978
- Runners-up: (1) 1979

=== National Championships ===
- Swiss national championship:
- Champions: (5) 1976, 1977, 1978, 1988, 1990
- Runners-up: (4) 1979, 1982, 1987, 1989

Sporting positions
| Preceded by Dick Steenbergen | European Champion (passenger); 1976 - 1978 | Succeeded by Roland Bollhalder |
| Preceded by Fritz Fuß | Sidecarcross World Champion (passenger); 1988 - 1989 | Succeeded by Tiny Janssen |
| Preceded by Andreas Grabner | Swiss national sidecarcross champion (passenger); 1976 - 1978 | Succeeded by Hugo Jung |
| Preceded by Fritz Fuß | Swiss national sidecarcross champion (passenger); 1988 | Succeeded by Hans-Rudi Stettler |
| Preceded by Hans-Rudi Stettler | Swiss national sidecarcross champion (passenger); 1990 | Succeeded by Adrian Käser |
