= List of national sidecarcross champions =

This is a List of national sidecarcross champions, including the national championships of Belgium, Denmark, Estonia, France, Germany, Great Britain, Latvia, the Netherlands, Lithuania Sweden and Switzerland. Of those competitions listed, the Belgian Championship is the oldest one, dating back to 1951, followed by the French, formed in 1956.

Bold denotes, the team also won the Sidecarcross World Championship or one of its predecessor competitions, the FIM-Cup or FIM European Championship, in that season.

== Belgium ==
The champions of the Belgian national championship, organised by the Fédération Motocycliste de Belgique:

| Year | Champions | Equipment | Result |
|---|---|---|---|
| 1951 | Karel Dom / | | Results |
| 1952 | Pierre Frenay / | | Results |
| 1953 | Pierre Frenay / | | Results |
| 1954 | Leon Liekens / | | Results |
| 1955 | Leon Liekens / | | Results |
| 1956 | Leon Liekens / | | Results |
| 1957 | Roger van Lerberghe / | | Results |
| 1958 | Leon Liekens / | | Results |
| 1959 | Leon Liekens / Jean Van Tongelen | | Results |
| 1960 | Joseph Brems / | | Results |
| 1961 | Leon Liekens / Jean Van Tongelen | | Results |
| 1962 | Leon Liekens / Jean Van Tongelen | | Results |
| 1963 | Leon Liekens / Jean Van Tongelen | | Results |
| 1964 | Leon Liekens / Jean Van Tongelen | Matchless | Results |
| 1965 | Leon Liekens / Jean Van Tongelen | | Results |
| 1966 | Georges van Tilt / | | Results |
| 1967 | Leon Liekens / Jean Van Tongelen | | Results |
| 1968 | Leon Liekens / Pierre van Hoof | Norton | Results |
| 1969 | Georges van Tilt / | Matchless | Results |
| 1970 | Alois de Kort / | | Results |
| 1971 | Alois de Kort / Louis de Laet | Wasp-Norton | Results |
| 1972 | Alois de Kort / Louis de Kort | Wasp-Kawasaki | Results |
| 1973 | Alois de Kort / Pierre van Hoof | Wasp-Kawasaki | Results |
| 1974 | Alois de Kort / Pierre van Hoof | Wasp-Kawasaki | Results |
| 1975 | Remi Deeschemacker / | | Results |
| 1976 | Alois de Kort / Leon Lariviere | Wasp-Norton | Results |

| Year | Champions | Equipment | Result |
|---|---|---|---|
| 1977 | Boudewijn de Kort / Karel Torfs | SPP-Kawasaki | Results |
| 1978 | Daniel van Bellingen / Raf d' Hollander | Wasp-Norton | Results |
| 1979 | Daniel van Bellingen / Raf d' Hollander | Wasp-Norton | Results |
| 1980 | Daniel van Bellingen / Raf d' Hollander | EML-Norton | Results |
| 1981 | Daniel van Bellingen / Raf d' Hollander | EML-Yamaha | Results |
| 1982 | Daniel van Bellingen / Raf d' Hollander | Wasp-Yamaha | Results |
| 1983–1991 | championship not held | | Results |
| 1992 | Eddy Ramon / Gino Strubbe | EML-KTM | Results |
| 1993 | Gunther Govverts / Sven Verbrugge | EML-KTM | Results |
| 1994 | Gunther Govverts / Sven Verbrugge | EML-KTM | Results |
| 1995 | Jacky Janssen / Wiljam Janssen | BSU-KTM | Results |
| 1996 | championship not held | | Results |
| 1997 | Peter Steegmans / Christian Verhagen | BSU-KTM | Results |
| 1998–2003 | championship not held | | Results |
| 2004 | Kristers Sergis / Sven Verbrugge | BSU-MTH | Results |
| 2005 | Jan Goethals / Dimitri Vandeursen | EML-MTH | Results |
| 2006 | **Daniel Willemsen / Sven Verbrugge** | Zabel-VMC | Result |
| 2007 | **Daniel Willemsen / Reto Grütter** | Zabel-VMC | Result |
| 2008 | Joris Hendrickx / Kaspars Liepiņš | KTM-AYR | Result |
| 2009 | **Joris Hendrickx / Kaspars Liepiņš** | KTM-VMC | Result |
| 2010 | Joris Hendrickx / Kaspars Liepiņš | KTM-VMC | Result |
| 2011 | Jan Hendrickx / Tim Smeuninx | Zabel-VMC | Result |
| 2012 | Jan Hendrickx / Tim Smeuninx | Zabel-VMC | Result |
| 2013 | **Ben Adriaenssen / Ben van den Bogaart** | KTM-WSP | Result |
| 2014 | Jan Hendrickx / Elvijs Mucenieks | KTM-WSP | Results |
| 2015 | Jan Hendrickx / Ben van den Bogaart | Husqvarna-WSP | Result |
| 2016 | | | |
| 2017 | | | |
| 2018 | | | |

The riders (passengers not included) with multiple championship wins, the number of championships they have won and in what era (first to last title):

| Rider | No | Years |
|---|---|---|
| Leon Liekens | 12 | 1954–1968 |
| Alois de Kort | 6 | 1970–1976 |
| Daniel van Bellingen | 5 | 1978–1982 |
| Jan Hendrickx | 4 | 2011–2015 |
| Joris Hendrickx | 3 | 2008–2010 |
| Daniel Willemsen | 2 | 2006–2007 |
| Gunther Govverts | 2 | 1993–1994 |

Source:"SIDECAR CROSS NATIONAL CHAMPIONSHIP BELGIUM". The John Davy Pages.

Source:"List of Belgium champions". sidecarcross.be.

== Denmark ==
The champions of the Danish championship, organised by the Danmarks Motor Union:

| Year | Champions | Equipment | Result |
|---|---|---|---|
| 1965 | Henning Skarving / Ib Stijernekilde | | Results |
| 1966 | Arne Nielsen / Kurt Schroder | | Results |
| 1967 | Henning Skarving / Ib Stijernekilde | | Results |
| 1968 | Ebbe Sorensen / Jorgen Jonsson | | Results |
| 1969 | Ebbe Sorensen / Jorgen Jonsson | BSA | Results |
| 1970 | Henning Skarving / Ove Johansen | | Results |
| 1971 | Henning Skarving / Ove Johansen | | Results |
| 1972 | Henning Skarving / Jorgen Jonsson | | Results |
| 1973 | Axel Larsen / Torbin Larsen | Wasp-Triumph | Results |
| 1974 | Ebbe Sorensen / Otto Andersen | | Results |
| 1975 | Per Jorgensen / Ole Hansen | Wasp-Norton | Results |
| 1976 | Finn Thomsen / Frede Thomsen | SPP-Norton | Results |
| 1977 | Per Jorgensen / Otto Andersen / Torbin Larsen | | Results |
| 1978 | Sven Larsen / Jimmy Christensen | Wasp-Norton | Results |
| 1979 | Bernt Linder Madsen / Torbin Larsen | | Results |
| 1980 | Sven Larsen / Jimmy Christensen | Wasp-Weslake | Results |
| 1981 | Sven Larsen / Jimmy Christensen | EML-Weslake | Results |
| 1982 | Sven Larsen / Jimmy Christensen | EML-Yamaha | Results |
| 1983 | Sven Larsen / Jan Larsen | EML-Yamaha | Results |
| 1984 | Finn Thomsen / Torbin Svendsen | | Results |
| 1985 | Sven Larsen / Jimmy Christensen | | Results |
| 1986 | Parmo Nielsen / Jorgen Bitsch | EML-Maico | Results |
| 1987 | Parmo Nielsen / Jorgen Bitsch | VMC-Maico | Results |
| 1988 | Parmo Nielsen / Jorgen Bitsch | VMC-Zabel | Results |
| 1989 | Parmo Nielsen / Jorgen Bitsch | VMC-Zabel | Results |

| Year | Champions | Equipment | Result |
|---|---|---|---|
| 1990 | Parmo Nielsen / Jorgen Bitsch | EML-Kawasaki | Results |
| 1991 | Parmo Nielsen / Jorgen Bitsch | EML-Zabel | Results |
| 1992 | Morten Jacobsen / Jesper Larsen | EML-KTM | Results |
| 1993 | Morten Jacobsen / Jesper Larsen | | Results |
| 1994 | Frank Jorgensen / Jannick Hansen | | Results |
| 1995 | Morten Jacobsen / Jesper Larsen | | Results |
| 1996–1998 | championship not held | | Results |
| 1999 | Jonas Stenberg / Benny Mortensen | | Results |
| 2000 | Jonas Stenberg / Benny Mortensen | | Results |
| 2001 | Magnus Wallavvuori / Stefan Melkersson | | Results |
| 2002 | Arne Simonsen / Frank Pantmann | VMC-MTH | Results |
| 2003 | Magnus Wallavvuori / Stefan Melkersson | VMC-Zabel | Results |
| 2004 | Magnus Wallavvuori / Stefan Melkersson | VMC-Zabel | Results |
| 2004 | Magnus Wallavvuori / Stefan Melkersson | VMC-Zabel | Results |
| 2005 | Frank Jorgensen / Lars Christoffersen | VMC-MTH | Results |
| 2006 | Patrick Fagerberg / Daniel Fagerberg | AYR-KTM | Results |
| 2007 | Magnus Wallavvuori / Stefan Melkersson | VMC-Zabel | Result |
| 2008 | Sonnie Folkersson / Mathias Andersson | MEFO-MTH | Result |
| 2009 | Henrik Soderqvist / Tobias Sylwan | MEFO-Husaberg | Result |
| 2010 | Sonnie Folkersson / Tim Gustavsson | MEFO-KTM | Result |
| 2011 | Tommy Sörensen / Andreas Lindén | AYR-Husaberg | Result |
| 2012 | Henrik Soderqvist / Tim Gustavson | WSP-Zabel | Result |
| 2013 | Arne Tilly / Robert Almthen | | Result |
| 2014 | John Nielsen / Andreas Zinkernagel | WSP-Zabel | Result |
| 2015 | Paule Bräsel / Jan Petersen | WSP-Zabel | Results |

The riders (passengers not included) with multiple championship wins, the number of championships they have won and in what era (first to last title):

| Rider | No | Years |
|---|---|---|
| Parmo Nielsen | 6 | 1986–1991 |
| Sven Larsen | 6 | 1978–1985 |
| Magnus Wallavvuori | 5 | 2001–2007 |
| Henning Skarving | 5 | 1965–1972 |
| Morten Jacobsen | 3 | 1992–1995 |
| Ebbe Sorensen | 3 | 1968–1974 |
| Henrik Soderqvist | 2 | 2009–2012 |
| Sonnie Folkersson | 2 | 2008–2010 |
| Frank Jorgensen | 2 | 1994–2005 |
| Jonas Stenberg | 2 | 1999–2000 |
| Finn Thomsen | 2 | 1976–1984 |
| Per Jorgensen | 2 | 1975–1977 |

Source:"SIDECAR CROSS NATIONAL CHAMPIONSHIPS DENMARK". The John Davy Pages.

== Estonia ==
The champions of the Estonian championship, organised by the Eesti Mootorrattaspordi Föderatsioon:

| Year | Champions | Equipment | Result |
|---|---|---|---|
| 2003 | Are Kaurit / Jürgen Jakk | | |
| 2004 | Jānis Daiders / Lauris Daiders | | |
| 2005 | Margo Sonn / Silver Kübar | AYR-KTM | |
| 2006 | Andrus Vaks / Raimo Kaul | | |
| 2007 | Kert Varik / Errki Kõiv | | |
| 2008 | Jānis Daiders / Lauris Daiders | | |
| 2009 | Gert Gordejev / Keit Kivaste | | Result |
| 2010 | Gert Gordejev / Maarek Miil | | Result |
| 2011 | Kert Varik / Erkki Kõiv | | Result |
| 2012 | Kert Varik / Erkki Kõiv | | Result |
| 2013 | Kert Varik / Erkki Kõiv | | Result |
| 2014 | Kert Varik / Erkki Kõiv | | Result |

Source:"SIDECAR CROSS NATIONAL CHAMPIONSHIPS ESTONIA". The John Davy Pages.

== France ==
The champions of the French championship, organised by the Fédération Française de Motocyclisme:

| Year | Champions | Equipment | Result |
|---|---|---|---|
| 1956 | Louis Dubois/Maurice Dubois | | Results |
| 1957 | Robert Perlin / Claude Segale | | Results |
| 1958 | championship cancelled | | Results |
| 1959 | championship cancelled | | Results |
| 1960 | Barat / | BSA | Results |
| 1961 | Bourgeois / | BSA | Results |
| 1962 | Bourgeois / | BSA | Results |
| 1963 | Paul Denis / | BSA | Results |
| 1964 | Paul Denis / | BSA | Results |
| 1965 | Paul Denis / Gilbert Tissier | BSA | Results |
| 1966 | Georges Schwegler / Roussey | BSA | Results |
| 1967 | Georges Schwegler / | BSA | Results |
| 1968 | Paul Denis / Bernard Barre | BSA | Results |
| 1969 | Georges Schwegler / Moussy | Lito | Results |
| 1970 | Christien Leroux | | Results |
| 1971 | Andre Galland / Blanc | Wasp-Norton | Results |
| 1972 | Paul Denis / Marc Seliery | Norton | Results |
| 1973 | Claud Hennequin / Dominique Vurpillot | Wasp-Norton | Results |
| 1974 | Rene Francois / Alain Plu | SPP-Norton | Results |
| 1975 | Claud Hennequin / Dominique Vurpillot | | Results |
| 1976 | Rene Francois / Marc Seillery | Wasp-Norton | Results |
| 1977 | Claud Hennequin / Dominique Vurpillot | Wasp-Norton | Results |
| 1978 | Michael Freund / Rene Freund | SPP-Norton | Results |
| 1979 | Francois Barat / Yves Jean Come | Norton | Results |
| 1980 | Edouard Bonnaz / Francois Gregis | EML-Yamaha | Results |
| 1981 | Francois Barat / J. C. Partier | EML-Yamaha | Results |
| 1982 | Edouard Bonnaz / Michael Claval | EML-Yamaha | Results |
| 1983 | Nicholas Samofal / Lucien Caggiano | EML-Yamaha | Results |
| 1984 | Nicholas Samofal / Lucien Caggiano | EML-Yamaha | Results |
| 1985 | Gilles Mecene / Michael Clavel | EML-Jumbo | Results |

| Year | Champions | Equipment | Result |
|---|---|---|---|
| 1986 | Alain Bouvet / Bruno Bouvet | Kawasaki | Results |
| 1987 | Alain Bouvet / Bruno Bouvet | Kawasaki | Results |
| 1988 | Gilles Mecene / Eric Morgan | EML-Kawasaki | Results |
| 1989 | Jean Paul Thomas / Marc Lebouquin | VMC-Honda | Results |
| 1990 | Gilles Mecene / Eric Morgan | EML-Kawasaki | Results |
| 1991 | Gilles Mecene / Eric Morgan | EML-Kawasaki | Results |
| 1992 | Gilles Mecene / Eric Morgan | EML-Kawasaki | Results |
| 1993 | David Barat / Sebastien Bellaud | EML-Kawasaki | Results |
| 1994 | Gillian Vanet / Bruno Bouvet | EML-KTM | Results |
| 1995 | David Barat / Sebastien Bellaud | VMC-Kawasaki | Results |
| 1996 | David Barat / Sebastien Bellaud | VMC-Kawasaki | Results |
| 1997 | David Barat / Sebastien Bellaud | JHR-Kawasaki | Results |
| 1998 | Benoit Beaumont / Emmanuel Rostiang | EML-MTH | Results |
| 1999 | Benoit Beaumont / Emmanuel Rostiang | EML-MTH | Results |
| 2000 | David Barat / Sebastien Bellaud | EML-MTH | Results |
| 2001 | Benoit Beaumont / Henry van der Wiel | BSU-MTH | Results |
| 2002 | Benoit Beaumont / Henry van der Wiel | BSU-MTH | Results |
| 2003 | David Barat / Herve Allier | VMC-MTH | Results |
| 2004 | Johnny Bettys / Alexandre Guillonneau | VMC-MTH | Results |
| 2005 | David Barat / Frances Blanco ^{1} | VMC-Zabel | Results |
| 2006 | Jean Marie Ains / Bernard Jayet | VMC-Zabel | Results |
| 2007 | André-Michel Bernard / Jacques Pillier | KTM | |
| 2008 | Jean Marie Ains / Teddy Rousseau | VMC-Jawa | |
| 2009 | Dorian Boileau / Paul Fessard | VMC-Husaberg | Result |
| 2010 | | | |
| 2011 | Valentin Giraud / Nicolas Musset | WHT-KTM | Result |
| 2012 | Valentin Giraud / Bertrand Poirier | WHT-KTM | Result |
| 2013 | Joris Hendrickx / Kaspars Liepiņš | | Result |
| 2014 | Valentin Giraud / Nicolas Musset | WHT-KTM | Result |
| 2015 | Valentin Giraud / Nicolas Musset | WHT-KTM | Result |

The most successful riders (passengers not included), the number of championships they have won and in what era (first to last title):

| Rider | No | Years |
|---|---|---|
| David Barat | 7 | 1993–2005 |
| Gilles Mecene | 6 | 1985–1992 |
| Paul Denis | 5 | 1963–1972 |

Source:"SIDECAR CROSS NATIONAL CHAMPIONSHIPS FRANCE". The John Davy Pages.

- ^{1} Also used Marco Godau as his passenger.

== Germany ==
A German national championship has been organised from 1974 onwards by the Deutscher Motor Sport Bund. Before that, from 1970, the OMSK-Pokal was considered to be an unofficial national championship and still continues to be organised, now under the name of DMSB-Pokal.

=== OMSK-Pokal ===
| Year | Champions | Equipment |
|---|---|---|
| 1970 | Herbert Simon / Klaus Jörgens | WASP-Hedlund |
| 1971 | P. Bullinger / B. Kunz | Triumph |
| 1972 | Herbert Simon / Hans Peppinghaus | WASP-Hedlund |
| 1973 | Franz Bichler / Gerhard Bichler | WASP-Norton |

=== National championship ===
Organised since 1974 the German national championship was converted to an international one in 2007, allowing non-German riders to win it from then on:

| Year | Champions | Nations | Equipment | Result |
|---|---|---|---|---|
| 1974 | Herbert Simon / Hans Georg Peppinghausen | (D/D) | Wasp-Hedlund | Results |
| 1975 | Reinhard Böhler / Egon Wuchner | (D/D) | Wasp-Yamaha | Results |
| 1976 | Reinhard Böhler / Walter Frech | (D/D) | Wasp-Yamaha | Results |
| 1977 | Reinhard Böhler / Hans Georg Peppinghausen | (D/D) | Wasp-Yamaha | Results |
| 1978 | Josef Brockhausen / Peter Bannenberg | (D/D) | Heos-Yamaha | Results |
| 1979 | Reinhard Böhler / Hans Georg Peppinghausen | (D/D) | Wasp-Yamaha | Results |
| 1980 | **Reinhard Böhler / Siegfried Müller** | (D/D) | Wasp-Yamaha | Results |
| 1981 | Josef Brockhausen / Hubert Rebele | (D/D) | Heos-Yamaha | Results |
| 1982 | Josef Brockhausen / Hubert Rebele | (D/D) | Heos-Yamaha | Results |
| 1983 | Reinhard Böhler / Franz Burkhardt | (D/D) | Wasp-Zabel | Results |
| 1984 | Reinhard Böhler / Ekard Bauer | (D/D) | Wasp-Zabel | Results |
| 1985 | Walter Netterscheid / Ralf Hoormann | (D/D) | Wasp-Maico | Results |
| 1986 | Walter Netterscheid / Ralf Hoormann | (D/D) | VMC-Maico | Results |
| 1987 | Walter Netterscheid / Ralf Hoormann | (D/D) | VMC-Maico | Results |
| 1988 | Walter Netterscheid / Jürgen Hassold | (D/D) | VMC-Maico | Results |
| 1989 | Michael Garhammer / Ralf Haas | (D/D) | EML-Jumbo | Results |
| 1990 | Walter Netterscheid / Lothar Jehle | (D/D) | HEOS-Zabel | Results |
| 1991 | Walter Netterscheid / Lothar Jehle | (D/D) | EML-Zabel | Results |
| 1992 | Klaus Weinmann / Thomas Weinmann | (D/D) | EML-KTM | Results |
| 1993 | Martin Gölz / Hans-Rudolf Stettler | (D/D) | VMC-Zabel | Results |
| 1994 | Klaus Weinmann / Thomas Weinmann | (D/D) | EML-KTM | Results |

| Year | Champions | Nations | Equipment | Result |
|---|---|---|---|---|
| 1995 | Martin Gölz / Hans-Rudolf Stettler | (D/D) | VMC-Zabel | Results |
| 1996 | Martin Gölz / Hans-Rudolf Stettler | (D/D) | VMC-Zabel | Results |
| 1997 | Alois Wenninger / Henry van der Wiel | (D/NL) | EML-MTH | Results |
| 1998 | Kristers Serģis / Artis Rasmanis | (LV/LV) | BSU-Zabel | Results |
| 1999 | Klaus Weinmann / Thomas Weinmann | (D/D) | EML-MTH | Results |
| 2000 | Klaus Weinmann / Thomas Weinmann | (D/D) | EML-MTH | Result |
| 2001 | Marko Happich / Sebastian Böhme | (D/D) | VMC-Zabel | Result |
| 2002 | Klaus Weinmann / Thomas Weinmann | (D/D) | EML-MTH | Result |
| 2003 | Marko Happich / Gertain Wijs | (D/NL) | VMC-Zabel | Result |
| 2004 | Marko Happich / Thomas Weinmann | (D/D) | VMC-Zabel | Result |
| 2005 | Josef Brustmann / Stefan Urich | (D/D) | NMP-KTM | Result |
| 2006 | Marko Happich / Meinrad Schelbert | (D/CH) | VMC-Zabel | Result |
| 2007 | Andy Bürgler / Martin Betschart | (CH/CH) | VMC-KTM | Result |
| 2008 | Marko Happich / Meinrad Schelbert | (D/CH) | VMC-Zabel | Result |
| 2009 | Marko Happich / Martin Betschart | (D/CH) | Mefo-Zabel | Result |
| 2010 | Peter Steegmanns / Sven Verbrugge | (B/B) | WSP-KTM | Result |
| 2011 | Jānis Daiders / Lauris Daiders | (LV/LV) | VMC-Zabel | Result |
| 2012 | Jānis Daiders / Lauris Daiders | (LV/LV) | VMC-Zabel | Result |
| 2013 | Andy Bürgler / Martin Betschart | (CH/CH) | VMC-KTM | Result |
| 2014 | Andy Bürgler / Martin Betschart | (CH/CH) | VMC-KTM | Result |
| 2015 | Joris Hendrickx / Kaspars Liepiņš | (B/LV) | VMC-KTM | Result |
| 2016 | Andreas Clohse / Christian Verhagen | (B/NL) | WSP-Zabel | Result |
| 2017 | Andreas Clohse / Andres Haller | (B/D) | WSP-Zabel | Result |
| 2018 | Davy Sanders / Andres Haller | (B/D) | WSP-Zabel | Result |
| 2019 | ? / ? | (?/?) | ? - ? | Result |

The most successful riders (passengers not included), the number of championships they have won and in what era (first to last title):

| Rider | No | Years |
|---|---|---|
| Reinhard Böhler | 7 | 1975–1984 |
| Marko Happich | 6 | 2001–2009 |
| Walter Netterscheid | 6 | 1985–1991 |
| Klaus Weinmann | 5 | 1992–2002 |

== Great Britain ==
The champions of the British championship, organised by the Auto-Cycle Union:

| Year | Champions | Equipment |
|---|---|---|
| 1965 | Roy Price / Stan Price | Triumph |
| 1966 | Len Crane / John Pearson | Cranwar |
| 1967 | Len Crane / John Pearson | Cranwar |
| 1968 | Mike Guilford / Malcolm Lambdon | Wasp-Triumph |
| 1969 | Mike Guilford / Fred Little | Wasp-Triumph |
| 1970 | Bob Nash / Trevor Jones | Wasp-Triumph |
| 1971 | Andy Wilkins / Nick Wilkins | WBS-Triumph |
| 1972 | John Turner / Nick Meredith | Wasp-Triumph |
| 1973 | Nick Thompson / Dave Beavis | Wasp-Norton |
| 1974 | Nick Thompson / Dave Beavis | Wasp-Norton |
| 1975 | Nick Thompson / Dave Beavis | Wasp-Norton |
| 1976 | Terry Good / Jess Rixon ^{1} | Wasp-Yamaha |
| 1977 | John Elliot / George Skeats | Wasp-Norton |
| 1978 | Nick Thompson / Garry Withers | Wasp-Heanes |
| 1979 | Terry Good / Jess Rixon ^{2} | Wasp-Norton |
| 1980 | Terry Good / Barry Williams | Wasp-Norton |
| 1981 | Terry Good / Barry Williams | Wasp-Norton |
| 1982 | Doug Fox / John Cooper | EML-Westlake |
| 1983 | Terry Good / Garry Withers | Wasp-Yamaha |
| 1984 | Terry Good / Garry Withers ^{3} | Wasp-Wasp |
| 1985 | Terry Good / Paul Thomas ^{3} | Wasp-Wasp |
| 1986 | Paul Millard / Mark Millard | EML-Jumbo |
| 1987 | Paul Millard / Mark Millard | EML-Jumbo |
| 1988 | Paul Millard / Mark Millard ^{4} | EML-Jumbo |
| 1989 | Paul Millard / Mark Millard ^{5} | EML-KTM |
| 1990 | Paul Millard / Jason Peters | EML-KTM |

| Year | Champions | Equipment |
|---|---|---|
| 1991 | Chris Etheridge / Nick Brace | EML-Zabel |
| 1992 | Chris Etheridge / Nick Brace ^{6} | EML-Zabel |
| 1993 | Chris Etheridge / Nick Brace ^{7} | EML-Zabel |
| 1994 | Chris Etheridge / Garry Withers | VMC-Zabel |
| 1995 | Chris Etheridge / Garry Withers | BSU-KTM |
| 1996 | Chris Etheridge / Mike Turner | BSU-KTM |
| 1997 | Chris Etheridge / Paul Henderson ^{8} | BSU-MTH |
| 1998 | Peter Clark / John Chambers | EML-Zabel |
| 1999 | Chris Etheridge / John Chambers ^{9} | EML-Zabel |
| 2000 | Chris Etheridge / John Chambers | BSU-MTH |
| 2001 | Chris Etheridge / John Chambers | VMC-MTH |
| 2002 | Stuart Brown / Luke Peters | VMC-Zabel |
| 2003 | Stuart Brown / Luke Peters | VMC-Zabel |
| 2004 | Stuart Brown / Jason Peters ^{10} | VMC-Zabel |
| 2005 | Stuart Brown / Jason Peters ^{11} | VMC-Zabel |
| 2006 | Stuart Brown / Luke Peters | VMC-Zabel |
| 2007 | John Watson / Mark Watson | VMC-Zabel |
| 2008 | Stuart Brown / Luke Peters | VMC-Zabel |
| 2009 | Stuart Brown / Luke Peters | VMC-Husaberg |
| 2010 | Stuart Brown / Luke Peters | VMC-Husaberg |
| 2011 | Stuart Brown / Josh Chamberlain | VMC-Husaberg |
| 2012 | Stuart Brown / Josh Chamberlain | MEFO-Zabel |
| 2013 | Stuart Brown / Josh Chamberlain | WSP-Zabel |
| 2014 | Stuart Brown / Josh Chamberlain | WSP-Zabel |
| 2015 | Stuart Brown / Josh Chamberlain | WSP-Zabel |
| 2016 | Stuart Brown / Josh Chamberlain | WSP-Zabel |
| 2017 | Stuart Brown / Joe Millard | WSP-Zabel |
| 2018 | Brett Wilkinson / Dan Chamberlain | ‘'WSP-Zabel'’ |
| 2019 | Stuart Brown / Josh Chamberlain | WHT-AMS650 |
| 2020 | TBC | TBC |

The most successful riders (passengers not included), the number of championships they have won and in what era (first to last title):

| Rider | No | Years |
|---|---|---|
| Stuart Brown | 16 | 2002–2017,2019 |
| Chris Etheridge | 10 | 1991–2001 |
| Terry Good | 7 | 1976–1985 |
| Paul Millard | 5 | 1986–1990 |
| Nick Thompson | 4 | 1973–1978 |

Source:"BRITISH CHAMPIONSHIP WINNERS". The John Davy Pages.

- ^{1} Also used Dave Beavis as a passenger.
- ^{2} Also used Barry Williams as a passenger.
- ^{3} Also used Andreas Hüsser as a passenger.
- ^{4} Also used Barry Williams & John Mitchelson as a passenger.
- ^{5} Also used Barry Williams as a passenger.
- ^{6} Also used Shane Skeats & Garry Withers as a passenger.
- ^{7} Also used Garry Withers as a passenger.
- ^{8} Also used David Keane as a passenger.
- ^{9} Also used Jason Peters as a passenger.
- ^{10} Also used Luke Peters as a passenger.
- ^{11} Also used Marc Cooper as a passenger.

== Latvia ==
The champions of the Latvian championship, organised by the Latvijas Motosporta Federācija:

| Year | Champions | Equipment | Results |
|---|---|---|---|
| 2002 | Māris Rupeiks / Haralds Kurpnieks | | |
| 2003 | Argo Poldsaar / Tonu Handsar | MTH | |
| 2004 | Jānis Daiders / Lauris Daiders | BSU-MTH | |
| 2005 | Alvis Tribockis / Māris Kirilko | VMC-MTH | |
| 2006 | Māris Rupeiks / Haralds Kurpnieks | | |
| 2007 | Jānis Daiders / Lauris Daiders | | |
| 2008 | | | |
| 2009 | Kert Varik / Erkki Koiv | | Result |
| 2010 | Arnolds Sīlis / Gints Sīlis | | Result |
| 2011 | Arnolds Sīlis / Gints Sīlis | | Result |
| 2012 | Arnolds Sīlis / Gints Sīlis | | Result |
| 2013 | Margo Sonn / Tanel Koiv | | Result |
| 2014 | Kert Varik / Erkki Koiv | | Result |

Source:"SIDECAR CROSS NATIONAL CHAMPIONSHIPS LATVIA". The John Davy Pages.

== Netherlands ==
The champions of the Netherlands sidecarcross championship, organised by the Koninklijke Nederlandse Motorrijders Vereniging:

| Year | Champions | Equipment | Results |
|---|---|---|---|
| 1961 | Henk Steman / Map de Haas | BSA | Results |
| 1962 | Henk Steman / Map de Haas | BSA | Results |
| 1963 | Henk Steman / H. van Rees | BSA | Results |
| 1964 | Cor van Heugten / Hans van Campen | BSA | Results |
| 1965 | Cor van Heugten / Hans van Campen | Matchless | Results |
| 1966 | Cor van Heugten / Hans van Campen | Matchless | Results |
| 1967 | Jan Ten Thije / Theo Ten Thije | BSA | Results |
| 1968 | Broer Dirkx / Joop Brouwers | BSA | Results |
| 1969 | Jan Ten Thije / Theo Ten Thije | BMW | Results |
| 1970 | Jan Ten Thije / Theo Ten Thije | BMW | Results |
| 1971 | **Rikus Lubbers / Joop Brouwers** ^{1} | Wasp-Norton | Results |
| 1972 | Broer Dirkx / Dick de Wolff | Wasp-Norton | Results |
| 1973 | Rikus Lubbers / Bart Notten | 'Wasp-Yamaha | Results |
| 1974 | Broer Dirkx / Andre Godschalk ^{2} | Wasp-Norton | Results |
| 1975 | **Ton van Heugten / Dick Steenbergen** | Hagon-Yamaha | Results |
| 1976 | Ton van Heugten / Dick Steenbergen | Hagon-Heuga | Results |
| 1977 | Willie van de Laan / Marius van de Berg ^{3} | ENK-Yamaha | Results |
| 1978 | Willie van de Laan / Jaap van Vliet | Wasp-Westlake | Results |
| 1979 | Ton van Heugten / Frits Kiggen | Wasp-Westlake | Results |
| 1980 | Ton van Heugten / Frits Kiggen | Wasp-Norton | Results |
| 1981 | Jan Bakens / Henk van Heek | Wasp-Yamaha | Results |
| 1982 | Rijn van Gastel / Eric Hurkmans | EML-Yamaha | Results |
| 1983 | August Muller / Cor van de Bijl | EML-Yamaha | Results |
| 1984 | Rijn van Gastel / Eric Hurkmans | EML-Jumbo | Results |
| 1985 | August Muller / Henk van Heek | VMC-Honda | Results |
| 1986 | Eimbert Timmermans / Eric Verhagen | EML-Maico | Results |
| 1987 | August Muller / Henk van Heek | VMC-Honda | Results |
| 1988 | Hans van Goch / Sies Huirkmans | EML-Jumbo | Results |
| 1989 | Eimbert Timmermans / Eric Verhagen | EML-Kawasaki | |

| Year | Champions | Equipment | Result |
|---|---|---|---|
| 1990 | Eimbert Timmermans / Eric Verhagen ^{4} | EML-Kawasaki | Results |
| 1991 | Benny Janssen / Frans Geurts van Kessel ^{5} | EML-Zabel | Results |
| 1992 | **Eimbert Timmermans / Eric Verhagen** | EML-Kawasaki | Results |
| 1993 | Marco Bens / Eric Toonen | | Results |
| 1994 | Gerton Kops / Gerwin Wijs | VMC-Zabel | Results |
| 1995 | Gerton Kops / Sies Huirkmans | BSU-KTM | Results |
| 1996 | Jacky Janssen / Wiljam Janssen | BSU-KTM | Results |
| 1997 | Jacky Janssen / Wiljam Janssen | EML-KTM | Results |
| 1998 | Daniel Willemsen / Marcel Willemsen | BSU-Zabel | Results |
| 1999 | **Daniel Willemsen / Marcel Willemsen** | BSU-Zabel | Results |
| 2000 | Jacky Janssen / Wiljam Janssen | EML-Zabel | Results |
| 2001 | Daniel Willemsen / Sven Verbrugge | BSU-Zabel | Results |
| 2002 | Daniel Willemsen / Dagwin Sabbe | VMC-Zabel | Results |
| 2003 | **Daniel Willemsen / Kaspars Stupelis** | VMC-Zabel | Result |
| 2004 | **Daniel Willemsen / Kaspars Stupelis** | VMC-Zabel | Result |
| 2005 | Eric Schrijver / Christian Verhagen | VMC-MTH | Result |
| 2006 | **Daniel Willemsen / Sven Verbrugge** ^{6} | VMC-Zabel | Result |
| 2007 | **Daniel Willemsen / Reto Grütter** | VMC-Zabel | Result |
| 2008 | **Daniel Willemsen / Reto Grütter** | VMC-Zabel | Result |
| 2009 | Peter Steegmans / Christian Verhagen | VMC-Zabel | Result |
| 2010 | Etienne Bax / Ben van den Bogaart | VMC-Zabel | Result |
| 2011 | Etienne Bax / Ben van den Bogaart | VMC-Zabel | Result |
| 2012 | Etienne Bax / Kaspars Stupelis | VMC-Zabel | Result |
| 2013 | Marcel Grondman / Christian Verhagen | VMC-Zabel | Result |
| 2014 | Etienne Bax / Kaspars Stupelis | VMC-Zabel | Result |
| 2015 | **Etienne Bax / Kaspars Stupelis** | VMC-Zabel | Result |
| 2016 | Ben Adriaenssen / Lauris Daiders | WSP-Husqvarna | |
| 2017 | Etienne Bax / Nicolas Musset | VMC-Zabel | |
| 2018 | Etienne Bax / Kaspars Stupelis | WSP-Zabel | |

The most successful riders (passengers not included), the number of championships they have won and in what era (first to last title):

| Rider | No | Years |
|---|---|---|
| Daniel Willemsen | 9 | 1998–2008 |
| Etienne Bax | 5 | 2010–2015 |
| Ton van Heugten | 4 | 1975–1980 |

Source:"SIDECAR CROSS NATIONAL CHAMPIONSHIP HOLLAND". The John Davy Pages.

- ^{1} Also used Bart Notten as his passenger.
- ^{2} Also used Henk Mensinck as his passenger.
- ^{3} Also used J. van Vliet and D. Grootendorst as his passenger.
- ^{4} Also used Frans Geurts van Kessel as his passenger.
- ^{5} Also used Ron Varga as his passenger.
- ^{6} Also used Reto Grütter as his passenger.

== Sweden ==
The champions of the Swedish championship, organised by the Svenska Motorcykel- och Snöskoterförbundet:

| Year | Champions | Equipment | Result |
|---|---|---|---|
| 1966 | Teddy Stromberg / Tore Stromberg | BSA | Results |
| 1967 | Knut Roskvist / Sven Magnusson | Lito | Results |
| 1968 | Teddy Stromberg / Tore Stromberg | HM | Results |
| 1969 | Kuno Malmqvist / Sven Ake Magnusson | BSA-Metisse | Results |
| 1970 | Bertil Larsson / Krister Palsson | Hedlund | Results |
| 1971 | Teddy Stromberg / Tore Stromberg | Wasp-Triumph | Results |
| 1972 | Ingemar Eriksson / Lars Olov Carlbom | Wasp-Norton | Results |
| 1973 | Ingemar Eriksson / Lars Olov Carlbom | Wasp-Norton | Results |
| 1974 | Teddy Stromberg / Tore Stromberg | TSS-Kawasaki | Results |
| 1975 | Ingemar Jonsson / Kjell Hansson | SPP-Piron | Results |
| 1976 | Olof Jardenberg / Kaj Jonsson | SPP-Yamaha | Results |
| 1977 | Lennart Gusatvsson / Ingemar Gustavsson | Wasp-Yamaha | Results |
| 1978 | Lennart Gusatvsson / Ingemar Gustavsson | EML-Yamaha | Results |
| 1979 | Leif Sylwan / Bengt Persson | Wasp-Norton | Results |
| 1980 | Leif Sylwan / Bengt Persson | EML-Yamaha | Results |
| 1981 | Jan Persson / Gosta Jeppsson | Wasp-Hedlund | Results |
| 1982 | Leif Sylwan / Bengt Persson | EML-Yamaha | Results |
| 1983 | Leif Sylwan / Jonny Birgersson | EML-Yamaha | Results |
| 1984 | Leif Sylwan / Jonny Birgersson | EML-Yamaha | Results |
| 1985 | Leif Sylwan / Bengt Persson | Wasp-Folan | Results |
| 1986 | Leif Sylwan / Bengt Persson | EML-Folan | Results |
| 1987 | Dan Olsson / Peter Johansson | | Results |
| 1988 | Sonny Pettersson / Peter Adolfsson | | Results |
| 1989 | Mats Palsson / Leif Davidsson | Folan | Results |
| 1990 | Hans Nilsson / Ingemar Olsson | VMC-Honda | Results |

| Year | Champions | Equipment | Result |
|---|---|---|---|
| 1991 | Mats Palsson / Leif Davidsson | EML-KTM | Results |
| 1992 | Magnus Larsson / Conny Johansson | KTM | Results |
| 1993 | Mats Gunnarson / Bengt Persson | EML-KTM | Results |
| 1994 | Morten Jacobsen / Jesper Larsen | BSU-KTM | Results |
| 1995 | Mats Palsson / Leif Davidsson | EML-KTM | Results |
| 1996 | Mats Palsson / Leif Davidsson | BSU-KTM | Results |
| 1997 | Leif Sylwan / Bengt Persson | Folan V2 | Results |
| 1998 | Cenneth Engstrand / Stefan Nyberg | BSU-MTH | Results |
| 1999 | Henrik Soderqvist / Tobias Sylwan | EML-MTH | Results |
| 2000 | Henrik Soderqvist / Tobias Sylwan | EML-MTH | Results |
| 2001 | Henrik Soderqvist / Tobias Sylwan | EML-MTH | Results |
| 2002 | Henrik Soderqvist / Tobias Sylwan | EML-MTH | Results |
| 2003 | Henrik Soderqvist / Tobias Sylwan | VMC-KTM | Results |
| 2004 | Henrik Soderqvist / Tobias Sylwan | VMC-KTM | Results |
| 2005 | Henrik Soderqvist / Tobias Sylwan | VMC-Husaberg | Results |
| 2006 | Henrik Soderqvist / Tobias Sylwan ^{1} | VMC-Husaberg | Results |
| 2007 | Henrik Soderqvist / Tobias Sylwan | AYR-Husaberg | |
| 2008 | Henrik Soderqvist / Tobias Sylwan | MEFO-Husaberg | Result |
| 2009 | Henrik Soderqvist / Tobias Sylwan | MEFO-Husaberg | Result |
| 2010 | Henrik Soderqvist / Tobias Sylwan | MEFO-Husaberg | Result |
| 2011 | Robert Gustavsson / Henrik Apelgren | Husaberg-VMC | Result |
| 2012 | Henrik Soderqvist / Tim Gustavsson | WSP-Zabel | Result |
| 2013 | Henrik Soderqvist / Tim Gustavsson | WSP-Zabel | Result |
| 2014 | Philip Stenborg / Simon Stenborg | WMC-Zabel | |
| 2015 | | | |

The most successful riders (passengers not included), the number of championships they have won and in what era (first to last title):

| Rider | No | Years |
|---|---|---|
| Henrik Soderqvist | 14 | 1999–2013 |
| Leif Sylwan | 6 | 1979–1986 |
| Teddy Stromberg | 4 | 1966–1974 |

Source:"SM Mästare (Swedish champions)". sidvagnscross.se.

Source:"SIDECAR CROSS NATIONAL CHAMPIONSHIP SWEDEN". The John Davy Pages.

- ^{1} Also used Colin Dunkley as his passenger.

== Switzerland ==
Two national sidecarcross championships exist in Switzerland, the championship of the SAM, the Schweizerischer Auto- und Motoradfahrer Verband, an amateur association, and the championship of the FMS, the FIM affiliated Fédération Motocycliste Suisse: Since 2002, the championship of the FMS has only been held once, in 2009.

=== FMS ===
| Year | Champions | Equipment |
|---|---|---|
| 1970 | Fritz Gerber / Ulrich Vogelsang | Norton |
| 1971 | Robert Grogg / Gerhard Martinez | Triumph |
| 1972 | **Robert Grogg / Gerhard Martinez** | Wasp-Norton |
| 1973 | Robert Grogg / Andreas Grabner | Wasp-Norton |
| 1974 | **Robert Grogg / Andreas Grabner** | Wasp-Norton |
| 1975 | Robert Grogg / Andreas Grabner | Wasp-Norton |
| 1976 | **Robert Grogg / Andreas Hüsser** | Wasp-Norton |
| 1977 | **Robert Grogg / Andreas Hüsser** | Wasp-Norton |
| 1978 | **Robert Grogg / Andreas Hüsser** | Wasp-Norton |
| 1979 | Hansi Bachthold / Hugo Jung | EML-Yamaha |
| 1980 | Robert Grogg / Alfred Schacher | Wasp-Norton |
| 1981 | Hansi Bachthold / Hugo Jung | EML-Yamaha |
| 1982 | **Emil Bollhalder / Karl Büsser** | EML-Yamaha |
| 1983 | **Emil Bollhalder / Karl Büsser** | EML-Yamaha |
| 1984 | **Hansi Bachthold / Fritz Fuss** | EML-Jumbo |
| 1985 | Thomas Graf / Markus von Rotz | MSA-KTM |
| 1986 | **Hansi Bachthold / Fritz Fuss** | EML-Jumbo |
| 1987 | **Hansi Bachthold / Fritz Fuss** | EML-Jumbo |

| Year | Champions | Equipment |
|---|---|---|
| 1988 | **Christoph Hüsser / Andreas Hüsser** | VMC-KTM |
| 1989 | Andreas Fuhrer / Hans-Rudi Stettler | VMC-Kawasaki |
| 1990 | Christoph Hüsser / Andreas Hüsser | VMC-KTM |
| 1991 | Christoph Hüsser / Adrian Käser | VMC-KTM |
| 1992 | Andreas Lenherr / Reinhard Weber | EML-Zabel |
| 1993 | **Andreas Fuhrer / Adrian Käser** | VMC-Kawasaki |
| 1994 | **Andreas Fuhrer / Adrian Käser** | VMC-Kawasaki |
| 1995 | **Andreas Fuhrer / Adrian Käser** | JHR-Kawasaki |
| 1996 | **Andreas Fuhrer / Adrian Käser** | JHR-Kawasaki |
| 1997 | Dominik Schoch / Hans Schläpfer | VMC-Yamaha |
| 1998 | Wolfgang Kuhn / Jochen Zimmermann | EML-Yamaha |
| 1999 | Dominik Schoch / Hans Schläpfer | VMC-Yamaha |
| 2000 | Dominik Schoch / Hans Schläpfer | VMC-Yamaha |
| 2001 | Ueli Müller / Josua Luscher | JHR-Kawasaki |
| 2002 | Ueli Müller / Reto Grütter | Kawasaki |
| 2003–2008 | not held | |
| 2009 | Andy Bürgler / Reto Grütter | VMC-KTM |
| 2010–2014 | not held | |

The most successful riders (passengers not included), the number of championships they have won and in what era (first to last title):

| Rider | No | Years |
|---|---|---|
| Robert Grogg | 9 | 1971–1980 |
| Andreas Fuhrer | 5 | 1989–1996 |
| Hansi Bachthold | 5 | 1979–1987 |

Source:"SIDECAR CROSS NATIONAL CHAMPIONSHIP SWITZERLAND". The John Davy Pages.

=== SAM ===
| Year | Champions | Equipment | Result |
|---|---|---|---|
| 1996 | Martin Krieg / Edi Schadegg | EML-Honda | |
| 1997 | Philipp Kempf / Roland Brotzge | EML-KTM | |
| 1998 | Hansruedi Herren / Setfan Wülser | KTM | |
| 1999 | Theo Morf / Mario Caminada | VMC-Yamaha | |
| 2000 | Eduard Bürgler / Meinrad Schelbert | Yamaha | Result |
| 2001 | Theo Morf / Roland Brotzge | Spatech-Yamaha | Result |
| 2002 | Theo Morf / Roland Brotzge | Yamaha | Result |
| 2003 | Andy Bürgler / Meinrad Schelbert | Spatech-KTM | Result |
| 2004 | Andy Bürgler / Meinrad Schelbert | Spatech-KTM | Result |
| 2005 | Andy Bürgler / Martin Betschart | KTM | Result |
| 2006 | Emil Koch / Walter Neff | BSU Zabel | Result |
| 2007 | Emil Koch / Martin Koch | BSU Zabel | Result |
| 2008 | Andy Bürgler / Daniel Heinzer | VMC-KTM | Result |
| 2009 | Martin Krieg / Roland Peterer | | Result |
| 2010 | Migg Koch / Marius Strauss | Zabel | Result |
| 2011 | Migg Koch / Marius Strauss | Zabel | Result |
| 2012 | Martin Krieg / Marius Strauss | | Result |
| 2013 | Marco Boller / Simon Wälti | | |
| 2014 | Marco Boller / Simon Wälti | | |
| 2015 | Kevin Bitsche / D. Bertschi | | Result |

== See also ==
- List of FIM affiliated federations
