= Karl Büsser =

Swiss sidecross rider

- Nationality: Switzerland
Motorcycle racing career statistics
Sidecarcross World Championship
Active years	1974 - 1983
Championships	(2) 1982 – 1983
1983 championship position	1st
Starts / Wins / Podiums / Poles / F. laps / Points; / 14 / 36 / / / 716

Karl Büsser is a Swiss retired sidecarcross passenger and double Sidecarcross World Champion, having won the competition in 1982 and 1983 as passenger of Emil Bollhalder.

Apart from his World and European Championship triumphs, Büsser has also won the Swiss national sidecarcross championship twice, in 1982 and 1983.

== Biography ==
Büsser made his debut in national and international sidecarcross in 1974 on the side of Ernst Ruegg, whose passenger he would remain until the end of the 1980 season. The two competed in what was originally the FIM-Cup and became the European Championship in 1975, to turn into the World Championship in 1980. The pair saw a continued improvement from season to season, finishing 21st overall in 1974 and coming in as high as fourth in 1977. After that, results declined again and, after two 11th places in 1978 and 1979 the duo finished 17th in 1980. In between, Büsser raced for one Grand Prix in 1979 with German driver Reinhard Böhler who would become the first-ever World Champion in the sport the following year.

In the Swiss national championship between 1974 and 1978, the team generally finished between places three and six. Only in the 1980 season did they finish below that, coming eighth.

In 1981, Büsser joined the team of Emil Bollhalder and, with his new driver, had much greater success than before. The two came second in the Swiss championship in 1981, followed by winning the competition in 1982 and 1983. In the World Championship the team came fourth in its first year together, followed by two championships, in 1982 and 1983. On both occasions, they relegated the German team of Josef Brockhausen and Hubert Rebele to second place, by 62 points in 1982 and 11 points in 1983.

After their double World Championship, Büsser retired from national and international competition at the end of the 1983 season, as did Emil Bollhalder.

== Honours ==
=== World Championship ===
- Champions: (2) 1982, 1983

=== National Championships ===
- Swiss national championship:
  - Champions: (2) 1982, 1983
  - Runners-up: (1) 1981

Sporting positions
Preceded by Frits Kiggen	Sidecarcross World Champion (passenger); 1982 - 1983	Succeeded by Fritz Fuß
Preceded by Hugo Jung	Swiss national sidecarcross champion (passenger); 1982 - 1983	Succeeded by Fritz Fuß
