= Tiny Janssen =

Dutch sidecross rider

- Nationality: Netherlands
Motorcycle racing career statistics
Sidecarcross World Championship
Active years	1987 - 1991
Championships	(1) 1990
1991 championship position	6th
Starts / Wins / Podiums / Poles / F. laps / Points; / 5 / 8 / / / 342

Tiny Janssen is a Dutch retired sidecarcross rider and the 1990 World Champion, which he won on a Honda-EML alongside driver Benny Janssen.

== Biography ==
Janssen first entered the Sidecarcross World Championship in 1987 on the side of Karl Mathis, with the pair coming 20th and 16th in 1987 and 1988.

In 1989, Janssen raced with Jan Bakens, only competing in two events this season and finishing 17th in the World Championship. the 1990 season saw him initially compete with Bakens again but then switching to become the passenger of Benny Janssen, replacing Frans Geurts van Kessel. The new combination performed well, eventually taking out the World Championship with a 13-point gap from Germans Michael Garhammer and Ralf Haas.

The 1991 season saw Janssen compete in the World Championship for the last time, racing only the Dutch Grand Prix, as passenger of Benny Janssen once more.

Janssen also took part in the Dutch national championship, racing with Geert Knuiman and Jan Bakens.

== Honours ==
=== World Championship ===
- Champions: (1) 1990

Sporting positions
Preceded by Andreas Hüsser	Sidecarcross World Champion (passenger); 1990	Succeeded by Eric Verhagen
