= Eric Verhagen =

Dutch sidecar rider

- Nationality: Netherlands
- Born: February 21, 1964 (age 62); Schijndel
Motorcycle racing career statistics
Sidecarcross World Championship
Active years	1986 - 1992
Championships	(2) 1991, 1992
1992 championship position	26th
Starts / Wins / Podiums / Poles / F. laps / Points; 143 / 24 / 47 / / / 1452

Eric Verhagen (born 21 February 1964) is a Dutch retired sidecarcross passenger and double World Champion.

Verhagen has also won the Dutch national sidecarcross championship four times, in 1986, 1989, 1990 and 1992. All his successes were achieved with Eimbert Timmermans as the team's driver.

== Sidecarcross world championship results ==
Verhagen's first success as a sidecarcross rider came in 1986, when he took out the Dutch national championship, together with Eimbert Timmermans. This season was also his first in the sidecarcross world championship, where the team finished sixteen's, with two seventh place race finishes as their best results.

After similar results in 1987, the team greatly improved in 1988, coming fifth in the world championship and taking out their first race win in the Dutch GP. After continuing good results in 1989 and 1990 and two more Dutch national championships, the team managed to take out their first world championship in 1991.

The following season, 1992, saw a repeat of the world championship and also a fourth Dutch title. Verhagen retired from the competition after that, as did Timmermans.

=== Season by season ===
Season	Driver	Equipment	Position	Points	Races	Wins	Second	Third
1986	(Netherlands) Eimbert Timmermans	Maico-EML	16	66	16	—	—	—
1987	(Netherlands) Eimbert Timmermans	Kawasaki-EML	17	61	16	—	—	—
1988	(Netherlands) Eimbert Timmermans	Kawasaki-EML	5	198	22	1	1	—
1989	(Netherlands) Eimbert Timmermans	Kawasaki-EML	3	257	24	4	2	4
1990	(Netherlands) Eimbert Timmermans	Kawasaki-EML	5	147	16	2	3	—
1991	(Netherlands) Eimbert Timmermans	Kawasaki-EML	1	252	18	5	3	2
1992	(Netherlands) Eimbert Timmermans	Kawasaki-EML	1	471	31	12	2	6
	Overall 1986 - 1992			1452	143	24	11	12

Source:"The John Davey Pages - Eric Verhagen". John Davey.

== Honours ==
=== World Championship ===
- Champions: (2) 1991, 1992

=== Netherlands ===
- Champions: (4) 1986, 1989, 1990, 1992

Sporting positions
Preceded by Tiny Janssen	Sidecarcross World Champion (passenger); 1991 - 1992	Succeeded by Adrian Käser
Preceded by Henk van Heek	Dutch national sidecarcross champion (passenger); 1986	Succeeded by Henk van Heek
Preceded by Sies Huirkmans	Dutch national sidecarcross champion (passenger); 1989 - 1990	Succeeded by Frans Geurts van Kessel
Preceded by Frans Geurts van Kessel	Dutch national sidecarcross champion (passenger); 1992	Succeeded by Eric Toonen
