= Siegfried Müller (sidecarcrosser) =

German sidecarcross passenger

- Nationality: Germany
Motorcycle racing career statistics
Sidecarcross World Championship
Active years	1974 1976 - 1981
Championships	(1) 1980
1981 championship position	5th
Starts / Wins / Podiums / Poles / F. laps / Points; 74 / 6 / 26 / / / 485

Siegfried Müller is a retired German sidecarcross passenger and, together with his driver Reinhard Böhler, the first-ever World Champion in the sport.

Müller has also won the German national sidecarcross championship in 1980.

== Sidecarcross world championship results ==
Müller made his debut in the FIM Cup, a predecessor of the world championship, in 1974, in the last year of the competition. With his driver, Eugen Siegle †2-16-2011, he achieved a sixth place overall.

From 1975 onwards, the FIM Cup was re-branded as FIM European Championship but the two did not take part in the 1975 edition and only entered again in 1976. This time, they finished fifth overall. Müller raced for two more seasons with Siegle but now with lesser success.

Müller joined Reinhard Böhler for the 1979 season. From 1980 onwards, the European championship was renamed the FIM World Championship and Siegfried Müller, together with Reinhard Böhler, became the first world champion and the only ones from Germany so far. They took out the title with an 88 point gap to the second placed team and also won the German championship.

Müller raced Böhler in 1981 before retiring from international competition.

=== Season by season ===
The competition which was to become the sidecarcross world championship in 1980 originated as the FIM Cup in 1971 and was renamed to European championship in 1975. Müller's results in these three competitions were:

Season	Driver	Equipment	Position	Points	Races	Wins	Second	Third
1974	Eugen Siegle	Hedlund-Wasp	6	58	12	—	—	2
1976	Eugen Siegle	Hedlund-SPP	5	58	14	—	—	—
1977	Eugen Siegle	Yamaha-Wasp	12	22	2	—	1	1
1978	Eugen Siegle	Siegle-Hedlund	15	14	8	—	—	—
1979	Reinhard Böhler	Yamaha-Wasp	9	50	10	—	1	1
1980	Reinhard Böhler	Yamaha-Wasp	1	236	22	6	7	2
1981	Reinhard Böhler	Yamaha-Wasp	5	47	6	—	1	2
	Overall 1974 - 1981			485	74	6	10	10

Source:"SIEGFRIED MULLER GP RECORD". John Davey.

== Honours ==
=== World Championship ===
- Champions: (1) 1980

=== Germany ===
- Champions: (1) 1980

Sporting positions
Preceded by new competition	Sidecarcross World Champion (passenger); 1980	Succeeded by Frits Kiggen
Preceded by Hans Georg Peppinghausen	German national sidecarcross champion (passenger); 1980	Succeeded by Hubert Rebele
