= Adrian Käser =

Swiss sidecarcross passenger

- Nationality: Switzerland
Motorcycle racing career statistics
Sidecarcross World Championship
| Active years | 1988–1989 1991 – 1996 |
| Championships | (4) 1993, 1994, 1995, 1996 |
| 1996 championship position | 1st |
Starts / Wins / Podiums / Poles / F. laps / Points; 147 / 22 / 51 / / / 1515

Adrian Käser is a Swiss retired sidecarcross passenger and four-time World Champion.

Käser has also won the Swiss national sidecarcross championship five times, in 1991 and from 1993 to 1996. After his last world championship in 1996, he retired from the sport.

== Sidecarcross world championship results ==
Käser first appeared in the sidecarcross world championship in 1988, on the side of Thomas Graf, participating in three GP's and earning a second place in the first race of the Czech GP as his best result. In the same season he also participated in two more GP's with different riders in each, Hubert Huwyler and Rudi Herren.

The following season, Käser only raced in one even, on the side of Rene Raggenbass in the GP of Finland. In 1990, he did not take part in the world championship at all.

From 1991 onwards, Käser's fortunes in the world championship took an up turn. He replaced Andreas Hüsser on the side of two-time world champion Christoph Hüsser and the team finished eighth in the world championship as well as taking out the Swiss national title. A sixth place followed the year after.

In 1993, Käser joined Andreas Fuhrer and the new combination became a dominant force in the world championship, winning four titles in a row from 1993 to 1996, both racing for the Moto-Club Aarberg. Additionally, they also took out the Swiss title in each of these four seasons. At the end of the 1996 season, both riders retired from the world championship.

=== Season by season ===
| Season | Driver | Equipment | Position | Points | Races | Wins | Second | Third |
| 1988 | (Switzerland) Thomas Graf | KTM-VMC | 13 | 40 | 6 | — | 1 | — |
| 1988 | (Switzerland) Huber Huwyler | KTM-EML | 9 | 18 | 2 | — | — | — |
| 1988 | (Switzerland) Rudi Herren | Honda-EML | 22 | 11 | 2 | — | — | — |
| 1989 | (Switzerland) Rene Raggenbass | KTM-VMC | 52 | 1 | 2 | — | — | — |
| 1991 | (Switzerland) Christoph Hüsser | KTM-VMC | 8 | 124 | 18 | — | 2 | 1 |
| 1992 | (Switzerland) Christoph Hüsser | Yamaha-VMC | 6 | 175 | 25 | — | 1 | 2 |
| 1993 | (Switzerland) Andreas Fuhrer | Kawasaki-VMC | 1 | 391 | 36 | 7 | 2 | 5 |
| 1994 | (Switzerland) Andreas Fuhrer | Kawasaki-VMC | 1 | 232 | 20 | 3 | 5 | — |
| 1995 | (Switzerland) Andreas Fuhrer | Kawasaki-JHR | 1 | 261 | 16 | 8 | 2 | 2 |
| 1996 | (Switzerland) Andreas Fuhrer | Kawasaki-JHR | 1 | 262 | 20 | 4 | 3 | 3 |
| | Overall 1988 – 1996 | | | 1515 | 147 | 22 | 16 | 13 |

Source:"The John Davey Pages – Adrian Käser". John Davey.

== Honours ==
=== World Championship ===
- Champions: (4) 1993, 1994, 1995, 1996

=== Switzerland ===
- Champions: (5) 1991, 1993, 1994, 1995, 1996

Sporting positions
| Preceded by Eric Verhagen | Sidecarcross World Champion (passenger); 1993–1996 | Succeeded by Artis Rasmanis |
| Preceded by Andreas Hüsser | Swiss national sidecarcross champion (passenger); 1991 | Succeeded by Reinhard Weber |
| Preceded by Reinhard Weber | Swiss national sidecarcross champion (passenger); 1993–1996 | Succeeded by Hans Schläpfer |
