= Andreas Fuhrer =

Swiss motorcycle racer (born 1959)

- Nationality: Switzerland
- Born: May 21, 1959 (age 67)
- Website: Official website
Motorcycle racing career statistics
Sidecarcross World Championship
Active years	1985 - 1996
Championships	(4) 1993, 1994, 1995, 1996
1996 championship position	1st
Starts / Wins / Podiums / Poles / F. laps / Points; 232 / 29 / 76 / / / 2349

Andreas Fuhrer (born 21 May 1959) is a Swiss retired sidecarcross rider and four-time World Champion.

Fuhrer has also won the Swiss national sidecarcross championship five times, in 1989 and from 1993 to 1996. After his last world championship in 1996, he retired from the sport.

== Biography ==
Fuhrer grew up in Seedorf and is a trained mechanic. He started racing sidecarcross in 1981 and qualified for the world championship for the first time in 1985, racing for the Moto-Club Aarberg.

From 1985 to 1996, Fuhrer raced in the world championship. Fuhrer earned his first podium in 1987 with passenger Hans Rudolf Stettler. In 1990, he achieved his first race win, at the Swiss GP. After Adrian Käser joined him as a passenger for the 1993 season, the team's fortunes improved dramatically, earning 22 race victories and four world championships together.

Fuhrer retired from the sport in 1996 for mostly financial reasons, finding it difficult to market sidecarcross in comparison to single-rider motocross. He also wished to leave the sport at the height of his career. He stayed away from racing for two years before taking up motocross again, this time in the solo class.

Fuhrer is married and has three children. He works and lives in Aarberg, where he owns a Kawasaki motocross motorcycle dealership, originally having worked in the local sugar factory.

== Sidecarcross world championship results ==
=== Season by season ===
Season	Passenger	Equipment	Position	Points	Races	Wins	Second	Third
1985	(Switzerland) Fritz Frauchinger	Yamaha-Wasp	26	12	4	—	—	—
1985	(Austria) Josef Meusburger	Yamaha-Wasp	26	13	2	—	—	—
1986	(Switzerland) Manfred Forster	KTM–VMC	15	70	20	—	—	—
1987	(Switzerland) Hans Rudolf Stettler	KTM-VMC	7	155	18	—	1	1
1988	(Switzerland) Hans Rudolf Stettler	Kawasaki-VMC	3	223	24	—	1	5
1989	(Switzerland) Hans Rudolf Stettler	Kawasaki-VMC	6	178	20	—	3	3
1989	(Netherlands) Sies Hurkmans	Kawasaki-VMC	6	20	4	—	—	—
1990	(Switzerland) Hans Rudolf Stettler	Kawasaki-VMC	3	204	18	3	—	3
1991	(Switzerland) Hans Rudolf Stettler	Kawasaki-EML	11	82	6	1	—	1
1992	(Switzerland) Hans Rudolf Stettler	Kawasaki-VMC	4	246	24	3	6	1
1993	(Switzerland) Adrian Käser	Kawasaki-VMC	1	391	36	7	2	5
1994	(Switzerland) Adrian Käser	Kawasaki-VMC	1	232	20	3	5	—
1995	(Switzerland) Adrian Käser	Kawasaki-JHR	1	261	16	8	2	2
1996	(Switzerland) Adrian Käser	Kawasaki-JHR	1	262	20	4	3	3
	Overall 1985 - 1996			2349	232	29	23	24

Source:"The John Davey Pages - Andreas Fuhrer". John Davey.

== Honours ==
=== World Championship ===
- Champions: (4) 1993, 1994, 1995, 1996

=== Switzerland ===
- Champions: (5) 1989, 1993, 1994, 1995, 1996

Sporting positions
Preceded by Eimbert Timmermans	Sidecarcross World Champion; 1993 - 1996	Succeeded by Kristers Serģis
Preceded by Christoph Hüsser	Swiss national sidecarcross champion 1989	Succeeded by Christoph Hüsser
Preceded by Andreas Lenherr	Swiss national sidecarcross champion 1993 - 1996	Succeeded by Dominik Schoch
