= Böhler (surname) =

Böhler, Bohler, and Boehler is a surname, and may refer to:

- Bruce Boehler (1917–1987), American basketball player
- George Boehler (1892–1958), American baseball player
- Britta Böhler (born 1960), German lawyer, member of the Dutch Senate
- Fred Bohler (1885–1960), American athlete, coach, and administrator
- George Bohler (1887–1968), American football, basketball, and baseball coach
- Henry Cabot Lodge Bohler (1925–2007), American airman and civil-rights activist
- Jochen Böhler (born 1969), German historian
- John Bohler (1797–1872), English botanist
- Laurin Böhler (born 1995), Austrian Judoka
- Lorenz Böhler (1885–1973), Austrian physician
- Otto Böhler (1847–1913), Austrian silhouette artist
- Peter Böhler (1712–1775), German Moravian missionary
- Reinhard Böhler (1945–1995), German motorcyclist
- Roy Bohler, American football, basketball, and baseball coach
- Stefanie Böhler (born 1981), German skier

== See also ==
- Bohler Canyon
- Boehlert
