= Bohle =

Bohle or Böhle is a German surname, and may refer to:

- Ernst Wilhelm Bohle (1903–1960), leader of the Foreign Organization of the German Nazi Party
- Hans-Georg Bohle (1948–2014), German geographer
- Klaus Bohle (born 1936), German sprint canoer

== See also ==
- Bohle River, a river in Queensland, Australia
- Böhler (surname)
- Behle
- Buhle
