= Behle =

Behle is a surname. Notable people with this name include:

- Aaron Behle, cast member of MTV's The Real World: Los Angeles (1993)
- Daniel Behle (born 1974), German operatic tenor and composer
- Frank Behle (1863–1939), American baseball executive
- Jochen Behle (born 1960), German cross-country skier
- Petra Behle (born 1969), German biathlete
- Renate Behle (born 1945), German opera singer, mother of Daniel
- William H. Behle (1909–2009), American ornithologist

== See also ==
- Behler (disambiguation)
- Bohle
- Buhle
