= Catasterismi =

Prose retelling of the mythic origins of stars and constellations

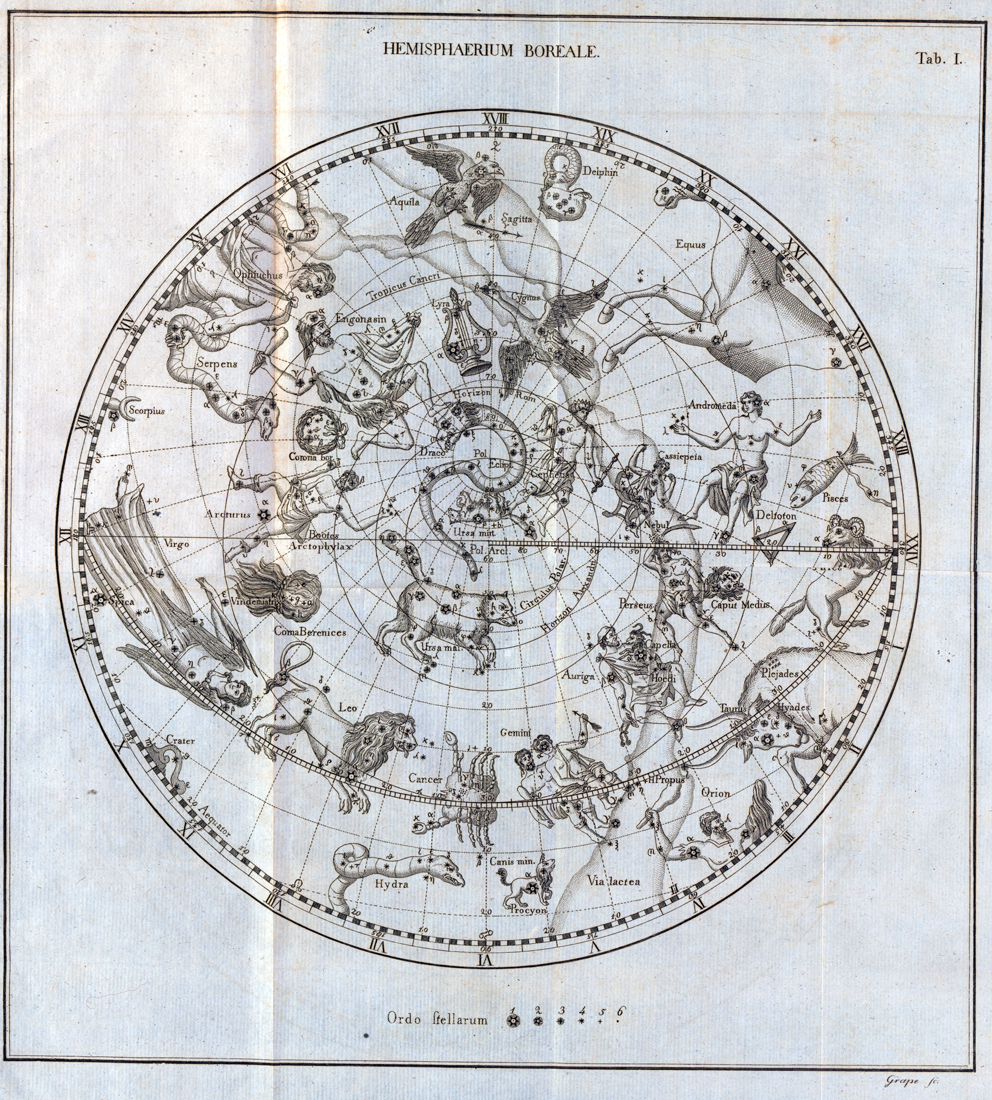
Mythological star groups in the northern hemisphere according to Eratosthenes

The Catasterismi or Catasterisms (Greek Καταστερισμοί Katasterismoi, "Constellations" or "Placings Among the Stars") is a lost work by Eratosthenes of Cyrene. It was a comprehensive compendium of astral mythology including origin myths of the stars and constellations. Only a summary of the original work survives, called the Epitome Catasterismorum, by an unknown author sometimes referred to as Pseudo-Eratosthenes. This summary dates to the 1st century BCE or CE.

== Summary ==
The Epitome records the mature and definitive development of a long process: the Hellenes' assimilation of a Mesopotamian zodiac, transmitted through Persian interpreters and translated and harmonized with the known terms of Greek mythology. A fundamental effort in this translation was the application of Greek mythic nomenclature to designate individual stars, both asterisms like the Pleiades and Hyades, and the constellations. In Classical Greece, the "wandering stars" and the gods who directed them were separate entities, as for Plato; in Hellenistic culture, the association became an inseparable identification.

Chapters 1–42 of the Epitome treat forty-three of the forty-eight constellations (including the Pleiades) known to Ptolemy (2nd century CE); chapters 43–44 treat the five planets and the Milky Way.

1. Ursa Major
2. Ursa Minor
3. Draco
4. "The Kneeler" (Hercules)
5. "The Crown" (Corona Borealis)
6. Ophiuchus
7. Scorpius
8. Boötes
9. Virgo
10. Gemini
11. Cancer
12. Leo
13. Auriga
14. Taurus
15. Cepheus
16. Cassiopeia
17. Andromeda
18. "The Horse" (Pegasus)
19. Aries
20. "The Delta-Shape" (Triangulum)
21. Pisces
22. Perseus
23. The Pleiades†
24. Lyra
25. "The Bird" or "The Swan" (Cygnus)
26. Aquarius
27. Capricornus
28. Sagittarius
29. Sagitta
30. Aquila
31. Delphinus
32. Orion
33. "The Dog" (Canis Major)
34. Lepus
35. Argo Navis†
36. Cetus
37. "The River" (Eridanus)
38. "The Fish" (Piscis Austrinus)
39. Ara
40. Centaurus
41. Hydra, Crater, and Corvus
42. "The One Preceding the Dog"/"Procyon" (Canis Minor)
43. "The Planets"†
44. "The Galaxy" (Milky Way)†

† Not one of the modern constellations.

Of the 48 Ptolemaic constellations, the ones not included are Corona Australis, Equuleus, Libra, Lupus, and Serpens. In modern times, Argo Navis (the ship Argo) has been divided into three constellations: Carina (the keel), Puppis (the stern), and Vela (the sails); and the Pleiades are recognized as a star cluster within the constellation Taurus.

The work cites in some places the lost Astronomia attributed to Hesiod. A similar later account is the Poeticon Astronomicon, or De Astronomica (tellingly also titled De Astrologia in some manuscripts that follow Hyginus' usage in his text) attributed to Gaius Julius Hyginus.

During the Renaissance, printing of the Epitome under the title Catasterismi, began early, but the work was always overshadowed by Hyginus, the only other ancient repertory of catasterisms. The Catasterismi was illustrated by woodcuts in the first illustrated edition by Erhard Ratdolt, (Venice 1482). Johann Schaubach's edition of the Catasterismi (Meiningen 1791) was also illustrated with celestial maps drawn from another work, Johann Buhle's Aratus (Leipzig, 2 volumes, 1793–1801).

After the old Teubner edition of A. Olivieri, Pseudo-Eratosthenis Catasterismi (Leipzig 1897), the text has a new complete edition including the recensio Fragmenta Vaticana. In 1997, an English translation and commentary by Theony Condos was published (including the De astronomia), which the classicist John Ramsey writes "cannot be relied upon to convey accurately the content of the original texts". In 2013, a Greek-French scientific translation and commentary by Jordi Pàmias I Massana and Arnaud Zucker was published.
