= Buhler =

Buhler, Buehler, or Bühler may refer to:

- Bühler, a town in the canton of Appenzell Ausserrhoden, Switzerland
  - Bühler railway station, a station of Appenzell Railways in Bühler
- Bühler (river), in Baden-Württemberg, Germany
- Buhler (surname)
- Buhler, Kansas, United States
- Bühler Group, a Swiss plant equipment manufacturer
- Buhler Industries, a Canadian farm equipment manufacturer
- Buehler Foods, a grocery store chain in Illinois, Indiana, and Kentucky
- Buehler's, a grocery store chain in northeastern Ohio, USA

== See also ==
- Bueler (disambiguation)
- Buhle
