= Buhle =

Buhle is a given name and a surname. Notable people with the name include:

- Johann Gottlieb Buhle (1763–1821), German philosopher
- Kathleen Buhle (born c. 1969), American author and non-profit executive, former wife of Hunter Biden
- Mari Jo Buhle (born 1943), American historian
- Paul Buhle (born 1944), American historian
- Walther Buhle (1894–1959), German general
- Buhle Mxunyelwa (born 1986), South African rugby union player
- Buhle Mkhwanazi (born 1990), South African soccer player
- Buhlebendalo "Buhle" Mda (born 1988), South African singer

== See also ==
- Buhler (disambiguation)
- Behle
- Bohle
