= Bueler =

Bueler or Bueller may refer to:

- Tim Bueler, founder of the High School Conservative Clubs of America
- Ferris Bueller, a fictional character in the 1986 movie Ferris Bueller's Day Off
  - Ferris Bueller (TV series)
- Bueller, the developmental code name for the Amazon Fire TV

== See also ==
- Buehler (disambiguation)
- Buhler (disambiguation)
