= Frits Kiggen =

Dutch sidecarcross rider

- Nationality: Netherlands
Motorcycle racing career statistics
Sidecarcross World Championship
Active years	1976 - 1979 and 1986 - 1988
Championships	(1) 1981
1988 championship position	10th
Starts / Wins / Podiums / Poles / F. laps / Points; 108 / 24 / 58 / / / 1091

Frits Kiggen is a Dutch retired sidecarcross passenger and the 1981 World Champion in the sport, together with his driver Ton van Heugten.

Kiggen has also won the Dutch national sidecarcross championship twice, in 1979 and 1980, and the European amateur sidecarcross championship in 1975. Additionally, he has taken part in the Dakar Rally on a number of occasions.

== Biography ==
Kiggen took out the 1975 IMBA European sidecarcross championship, an amateur competition, on the side of Jan Nouwens.

In 1982, Kiggen and Van Heugten took part in the Dakar Rally. He again took part in the competition in 2004, 2005 and 2007 in the truck category, for GINAF.

Kiggen's racing partner of many years, Ton van Heugten, died on 27 March 2008 of a heart attack, aged 62, in his home town of Amersfoort.

== Sidecarcross world championship results ==
Kiggen made his debut in the European Championship, a predecessor of the World Championship, in 1976, in 1976, on the side of Broer Dirkx.

Kiggen did not return to this competition until 1979, now racing with Ton van Heugten, the two becoming a very successful combination. They won the Dutch championship twice together, in 1979 and 1980.

From 1980 onwards, the European championship was renamed the FIM World Championship and Van Heugten/Kiggen, finishing fourth in its first year, became the second World Champion in 1981, despite Kiggen, breaking his collar bone during the season and having to be replaced with Sies Hurkmans for four races.

Kiggen continued to race with Van Heugten until 1986, achieving four more top-three finishes in the World Championship. Kiggen also raced with other drivers in this time and finished his World Championship career on the side of Jan Bakens in 1988.

=== Season by season ===
The competition which was to become the sidecarcross world championship in 1980 originated as the FIM Cup in 1971 and was renamed to European championship in 1975. Kiggen's results in these competitions were:

Season	Driver	Equipment	Position	Points	Races	Wins	Second	Third
1976	Broer Dirkx		29	6	2	—	—	—
1979	Ton van Heugten	Weslake-Wasp	6	82	14	—	1	3
1980	Ton van Heugten	Yamaha-EML	4	126	18	2	1	5
1981	Ton van Heugten	Yamaha-Wasp	1	169	14	9	1	—
1982	Ton van Heugten	Yamaha-Wasp	3	102	8	4	1	3
1983	Jan Bakens	Yamaha-EML	9	46	6	2	—	—
1984	Ton van Heugten	Folan-Wasp	2	232	20	4	1	4
1985	Ton van Heugten	Folan-Wasp	3	238	18	3	6	2
1986	Ton van Heugten	Folan-EML	3	39	2	—	2	—
1986	Benny Janssen	Maico-EML	6	58	2	—	2	1
1988	Benny Janssen	Jumb0-EML	10	24	2	—	1	—
1988	Jan Bakens	Folan-EML	17	10	2	—	—	—
	Overall 1976 - 1988			1091	108	24	16	18

Source:"The John Davey Pages - Frits Kiggen". John Davey.

== Honours ==
=== World Championship ===
- Champions: (1) 1981
- Runners-up: (1) 1984

=== Netherlands ===
- Champions: (2) 1979, 1980

Sporting positions
Preceded by Siegfried Müller	Sidecarcross World Champion (passenger); 1981	Succeeded by Karl Büsser
Preceded by Jaap van Vliet	Dutch national sidecarcross champion (passenger); 1979 - 1980	Succeeded by Henk van Heek
