= Robert Grogg =

Swiss sidecross rider

- Nationality: Switzerland
- Born: 1948 (age 77–78)
Motorcycle racing career statistics
Sidecarcross World Championship
Active years	1971 - 1984
Manufacturers	Norton-Wasp (1971-81) Yamaha-Wasp (1982-84)
1984 championship position	36th
Starts / Wins / Podiums / Poles / F. laps / Points; 160 / 60 / 94 / / / 1,363

Robert Grogg (born 1948) is a Swiss retired sidecarcross rider and triple Sidecarcross European Champion, having won the competition in 1976, 1977 and 1978, together with his passenger Andreas Hüsser. He has also won the FIM-Cup, the predecessor of the European Championship twice, in 1972 and 1974.

Apart from his FIM-Cup and European Championship triumphs, Grogg has also won the Swiss national sidecarcross championship nine times, eight of those being consecutive titles from 1971 to 1978, and a ninth title in 1980.

Grogg dominated the Swiss and European sidecarcross scene in the 1970s, riding on a bike powered by a British Norton engine. His dominance ended when the European Championship was renamed in 1980 and the 1000 cc Yamaha engines became dominant for a time.

== Biography ==
Grogg started racing motorcycles at the age of 17, racing in the solo class until 1970 when he switched to sidecarcross.

Grogg was part of the inaugural season of what would eventually become the Sidecarcross World Championship but what started in 1971 as the FIM-Cup. Grogg, racing with Gerhard Martinez in the Swiss Grand Prix, finished eighth, the only race he took part of in this season. He however also competed in the national Swiss championship which was in its second edition, and won this competition, beating Lorenz Haller by a point. Grogg would dominate this competition from 1971 to 1978, winning it every year, with Haller and future World Champion Emil Bollhalder as his main competitors.

Grogg and Martinez, a team again in 1972, won the FIM-Cup that year, beating previous season's champion Rikus Lubbers by a point. The year after Grogg, now riding with Andreas Grabner as his passenger, was beaten by Haller in the FIM-Cup but took the trophy back in 1974 when he and Grabner defeated Austrians Bruno Schneider and Werner Fink. In 1974, he also won the US championship organised by AMA.

In 1975, the FIM-Cup became the European Championship and Grogg and Grabner came very close to winning this competition, too, coming second by two points to Dutch riders Ton van Heugten and Dick Steenbergen. The next four seasons Grogg rode with Andreas Hüsser as his passenger and the new combination proved instantly successful. Grogg and Hüsser won the European Championship for the next three seasons from 1975 to 1978, with an 80 point margin in 1978 as their best result.

The 1979, season saw Grogg finish without a title as he and Hüsser finished runners-up in both Europe and Switzerland. In Europe they were beaten by 29 points by Emil and Roland Bollhalder while, in Switzerland, they lost by only three points to Hansi Bächtold and Hugo Jung. The team of Grogg and Hüsser went through an unlucky period at the time with Hüsser breaking a leg in both the 1979 and 1980 season.

Grogg won his last title in 1980 when he, now riding with Alfred Schacher as his passenger, won the Swiss championship or a ninth time. In the first edition of what had now become the World Championship, Grogg came fifth, a result he would repeat in 1982. In between, in 1981, he came sixth, riding with Andreas Hüsser once more. Hüsser would stay as his passenger until Grogg finished his career in 1984, but the pair was unable to repeat the success they had in the 1970s, competing only in selected races in the last two seasons. In Switzerland, the pair finished runners-up once more in 1982 but then did not race the national championship at all anymore.

Grogg retired after the 1984 season while Hüsser, the passenger he had the most success with, would ride on and win two World Championships on the side of his twin brother Christoph.

== Private life ==
Grogg, a father of two children born while he was still racing, operates a motorcycle business in Deitingen, Switzerland.

== Honours ==
=== European Championship ===
- Champions: (3) 1976, 1977, 1978
- Runners-up: (2) 1975, 1979

=== FIM-Cup ===
- Champions: (2) 1972, 1974
- Runners-up: (1) 1973

=== National Championships ===
- Swiss national championship:
  - Champions: (9) 1971–1978, 1980
  - Runners-up: (2) 1979, 1982

Sporting positions
Preceded by Rikus Lubbers	FIM-Cup; 1972	Succeeded by Lorenz Haller
Preceded by Lorenz Haller	FIM-Cup; 1974	Succeeded by competition discontinued
Preceded by Ton van Heugten	Sidecarcross European Champion; 1975 – 1978	Succeeded by Emil Bollhalder
Preceded by Fritz Gerber	Swiss national sidecarcross champion 1971 - 1978	Succeeded by Hansi Bächtold
Preceded by Hansi Bächtold	Swiss national sidecarcross champion 1980	Succeeded by Hansi Bächtold
