= Boehlert =

Boehlert is a surname. Notable people with the surname include:

- Eric Boehlert (1965–2022), American writer
- Sherwood Boehlert (1936–2021), American politician

== See also ==
- Böhler (surname)
