= Eimbert Timmermans =

Dutch sidecross rider

- Nationality: Netherlands
- Born: October 24, 1961 (age 65) 's-Hertogenbosch
Motorcycle racing career statistics
Sidecarcross World Championship
Active years	1986 - 1992 1995
Championships	(2) 1991, 1992
1995 championship position	26th
Starts / Wins / Podiums / Poles / F. laps / Points; 149 / 24 / 47 / / / 1470

Eimbert Timmermans (born 24 October 1961) is a Dutch retired sidecarcross rider and double World Champion.

Timmermans has also won the Dutch national sidecarcross championship four times, in 1986, 1989, 1990, and 1992. All his successes were achieved with Eric Verhagen as his passenger.

== Biography ==
After the end of his sidecarcross career in 1992, Timmermans opened a transport company, Timtrans, whose director he is.

Timmermans continues to be involved in motor sport, having taken part in the 2009 Dakar Rally as a mechanic in the truck category.

== Sidecarcross world championship results ==
Timmermans's first success as a sidecarcross rider came in 1986, when he took out the Dutch national championship, together with Eric Verhagen. This season was also his first in the sidecarcross world championship, where the team finished sixteen's, with two seventh place race finishes as their best results.

After similar results in 1987, the team greatly improved in 1988, coming fifth in the world championship and taking out their first race win in the Dutch GP. After continuing good results in 1989 and 1990 and two more Dutch national championships, the team managed to take out their first world championship in 1991.

The following season, 1992, saw a repeat of the world championship and also a fourth Dutch title. Timmermans retired from the competition after that, as did Eric Verhagen.

Timmermans returned for six races in 1995 with passenger Andre Visser, but had limited success and did not race in the world championship again.

=== Season by season ===
Season	Passenger	Equipment	Position	Points	Races	Wins	Second	Third
1986	(Netherlands) Eric Verhagen	Maico-EML	16	66	16	—	—	—
1987	(Netherlands) Eric Verhagen	Kawasaki-EML	17	61	16	—	—	—
1988	(Netherlands) Eric Verhagen	Kawasaki-EML	5	198	22	1	1	—
1989	(Netherlands) Eric Verhagen	Kawasaki-EML	3	257	24	4	2	4
1990	(Netherlands) Eric Verhagen	Kawasaki-EML	5	147	16	2	3	—
1991	(Netherlands) Eric Verhagen	Kawasaki-EML	1	252	18	5	3	2
1992	(Netherlands) Eric Verhagen	Kawasaki-EML	1	471	31	12	2	6
1995	(Netherlands) Andre Visser	Kawasaki-BSU	26	18	6	—	—	—
	Overall 1986 - 1995			1470	149	24	11	12

Source: "The John Davey Pages - Eimbert Timmermans". John Davey.

== Honours ==
=== World Championship ===
- Champions: (2) 1991, 1992

=== Netherlands ===
- Champions: (4) 1986, 1989, 1990, 1992

Sporting positions
Preceded by Benny Janssen	Sidecarcross World Champion; 1991 - 1992	Succeeded by Andreas Fuhrer
Preceded by August Muller	Dutch national sidecarcross champion 1986	Succeeded by August Muller
Preceded by Hans van Goch	Dutch national sidecarcross champion 1989 - 1990	Succeeded by Benny Janssen
Preceded by Benny Janssen	Dutch national sidecarcross champion 1992	Succeeded by Marco Bens
