= Ton van Heugten =

Dutch sidecar rider (1945–2008)

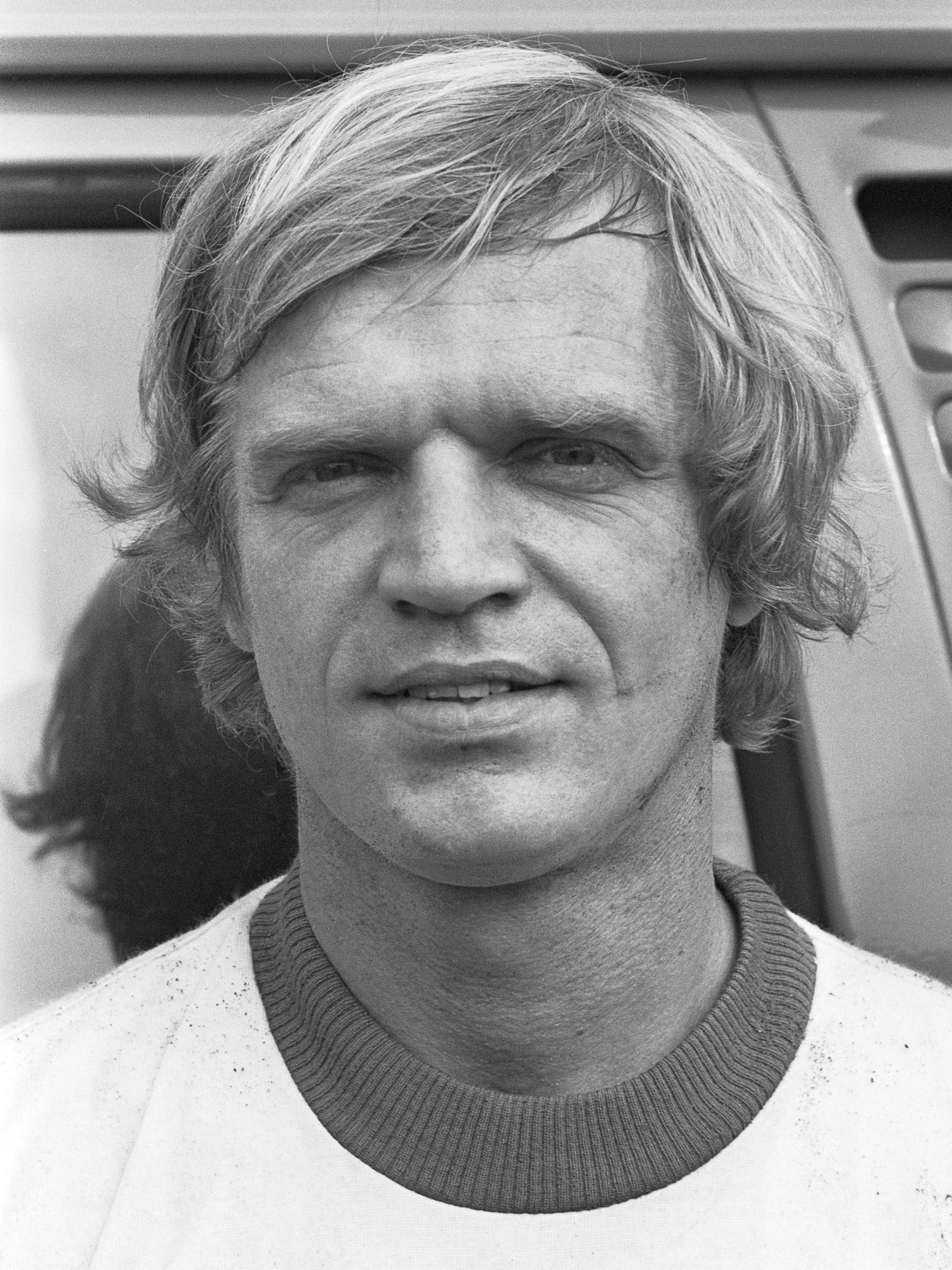
- Ton van Heugten (1980)
- Nationality: Netherlands
- Born: September 9, 1945
- Died: March 27, 2008; Amersfoort, Netherlands
Motorcycle racing career statistics
Sidecarcross World Championship
| Active years | 1972–1989 |
| Championships | (1) 1981 |
| 1989 championship position | 10th |
Starts / Wins / Podiums / Poles / F. laps / Points; 223 / 34 / 106 / / / 1921

Antonius Maria van Heugten (9 September 1945 – 27 March 2008) was a Dutch sidecarcross rider and the 1981 World Champion in the sport, together with his passenger Frits Kiggen.

He has also won the Dutch national sidecarcross championship four times, 1975, 1976, 1979 and 1980 and the FIM European Championship in 1975.

== Biography ==
Antonius Maria van Heugten, commonly referred to as Ton van Heugten, was born on 9 September 1945, as the second-last of fifteen children. He was born into a family of motocross enthusiasts, having nine brothers and five sisters. One of his brothers, Cor van Heugten, was Dutch national sidecarcross champion, from 1964 to 1966, while another brother, Fons van Heugten, also competed in the FIM European Championship.

Van Heugten was a BMX pioneer in the Netherlands, taking part in competitive races when he wasn't allowed to race motocross in the 1950s.

Van Heugten began riding in the solo class from the age of ten, but was not allowed to take part in competitions due to his age. He won the Dutch national championship in the 50 cc class in 1963, in the 250 cc class in 1964 and 1965 and in the 500 cc class in 1966. He also competed in the Motocross World Championship. He suffered a complicated leg fracture in 1966.

Van Heugten took up the sidecarcross sport in 1971 and remained active in motor sport until 1989. As his reason for switching from the solo version of the sport to the sidecarcross one at the age of 25, he stated that he considered it too late to switch once he was over 30.

In 1982, van Heugten and Frits Kiggen took part in the Rally Paris-Dakar.

Van Heugten died on 27 March 2008 of a heart attack, aged 62. He was buried in his home town Amersfoort on 2 April 2008.

== Sidecarcross world championship results ==
Van Heugten made his debut in the FIM Cup, a predecessor of the world championship, in 1972, in the second year of the competition. With his passenger Jaak Wery, he achieved a third place overall in the competition.

In 1974, van Heugten switched passengers, racing with Dick Steenbergen. He raced with Steenbergen for five seasons, winning the competition, now renamed the FIM European Championship, in 1975. The team had a difficult year in 1978, struggling in the domestic championship and finishing only twelfth in Europe.

From 1979, van Heugten used Frits Kiggen as his passenger, the two becoming a very successful combination. From 1980 onwards, the European championship was renamed the FIM World Championship and van Heugten, finishing fourth in its first year, became the second world champion in 1981, despite Kiggen, his passenger, having broken his collar bone during the season and having to be replaced with Sies Hurkmans for four races.

Van Heugten continued to be a successful rider in the world championship, finishing in the top-three four more times. He won his last world championship race at the Portuguese GP in 1986, his last really strong season, finishing third overall.

Van Heugten continued to race internationally until 1989, when he retired.

=== Season by season ===
The competition which was to become the sidecarcross world championship in 1980 originated as the FIM Cup in 1971 and was renamed to European championship in 1975. Van Heugtens's results in these three competitions were:

| Season | Passenger | Equipment | Position | Points | Races | Wins | Second | Third |
| 1972 | Jaak Wery | Norton-Wasp | 3 | 54 | 8 | — | 2 | 3 |
| 1973 | Jaak Wery | Norton-Wasp | 12 | 17 | 2 | — | 1 | — |
| 1974 | Dick Steenbergen | Yamaha-Wasp | 4 | 77 | 14 | — | 2 | 2 |
| 1975 | Dick Steenbergen | Yamaha-Hagon | 1 | 141 | 18 | 5 | 3 | 4 |
| 1976 | Dick Steenbergen | Yamaha-Hagon | 4 | 110 | 16 | 3 | 1 | 4 |
| 1977 | Dick Steenbergen | Yamaha-Hagon | 9 | 29 | 6 | — | — | 2 |
| 1978 | Dick Steenbergen | Yamaha-Hagon | 12 | 20 | 10 | — | — | — |
| 1979 | Frits Kiggen | Weslake-Wasp | 6 | 82 | 14 | — | 1 | 3 |
| 1980 | Frits Kiggen | Yamaha-EML | 4 | 126 | 18 | 2 | 1 | 5 |
| 1981 | Frits Kiggen | Yamaha-Wasp | 1 | 169 | 14 | 9 | 1 | — |
| 1981 | Sies Hurkmans | Yamaha-Wasp | 1 | 47 | 4 | 1 | 2 | 1 |
| 1982 | Frits Kiggen | Yamaha-Wasp | 3 | 102 | 8 | 4 | 1 | 3 |
| 1982 | Jaap van Vliet | Yamaha-Wasp | 3 | 22 | 4 | — | 1 | 1 |
| 1983 | Jaap van Vliet | Yamaha-Tri | 15 | 24 | 3 | — | 1 | — |
| 1984 | Frits Kiggen | Folan-Wasp | 2 | 232 | 20 | 4 | 1 | 4 |
| 1985 | Frits Kiggen | Folan-Wasp | 3 | 238 | 18 | 3 | 6 | 2 |
| 1986 | Frits Kiggen | Folan-EML | 3 | 39 | 2 | — | 2 | — |
| 1986 | Ton Maessen | Folan-EML | 3 | 74 | 6 | 1 | 1 | 2 |
| 1986 | Piet Vandeutekom | Folan-EML | 3 | 133 | 12 | 2 | 1 | 3 |
| 1987 | Piet Vandeutekom | Folan-VMC | 36 | 6 | 2 | — | — | — |
| 1988 | Andre Godschalk | KTM-EML | 12 | 36 | 6 | — | — | — |
| 1988 | Ralph Hoormann | KTM-EML | 12 | 47 | 4 | — | — | 2 |
| 1989 | Epe Willems | KTM-EML | 10 | 96 | 14 | — | — | 3 |
| | Overall 1972 - 1989 | | | 1921 | 223 | 34 | 28 | 44 |

- With the exception of Ralph Hoormann, who was German, all his passengers were Dutch nationals.

== Honours ==
=== World Championship ===
- Champions: (1) 1981
- Runners-up: (1) 1984

=== European Championship ===
- Champions: (1) 1975

=== Netherlands ===
- Champions: (4) 1975, 1976, 1979, 1980

Sporting positions
| Preceded by Reinhard Böhler | Sidecarcross World Champion; 1981 | Succeeded by Emil Bollhalder |
| Preceded by new competition | Sidecarcross European Champion; 1975 | Succeeded by Robert Grogg |
| Preceded by Broer Dirkx | Dutch national sidecarcross champion 1975–1976 | Succeeded by Willie van de Laan |
| Preceded by Willie van de Laan | Dutch national sidecarcross champion 1979–1980 | Succeeded by Jan Bakens |
