= Behler =

Behler may refer to:

- Behler, West Virginia, an unincorporated community in Monongalia County
- Behler See, a lake in Germany

== People ==
- Chuck Behler (born 1965), American musician
- Ernst Behler (1928–1997), german philosopher
- John L. Behler (c. 1946–2006), American naturalist, herpetologist and activist
- Klemens Behler (1921–1998), Obersturmbannführer, in the Waffen SS during World War II
