= Benny Janssen =

Dutch sidecross rider

- Nationality: Netherlands
Motorcycle racing career statistics
Sidecarcross World Championship
Active years	1982 - 1991
Manufacturers	Yamaha-Wasp (1982–85) Maico-EML (1986) Jumbo-EML (1987–88) Honda-EML (1989–90) Zabel-EML (1991)
Championships	(1) 1990
1991 championship position	6th
Starts / Wins / Podiums / Poles / F. laps / Points; 158 / 14 / 47 / / / 1,535

Benny Janssen is a Dutch retired sidecarcross rider and the 1990 World Champion, which he won on a Honda-EML, together with his passenger Tiny Janssen.

The year after his World Championship triumph , Janssen has also won the Dutch national sidecarcross championship, riding with his most regular passenger throughout his career, Frans Geurts van Kessel.

== Biography ==
Janssen first entered the Sidecarcross World Championship in 1982 with Frans Geurts van Kessel as his passenger, competing in the Dutch and Belgian Grand Prix and earning three points from those two appearances. The following season Janssen used two passengers during his World Championship campaign, van Kessel and Henk van Heek, and earned 39 points all season, finishing in tenth place overall.

The next two seasons, Janssen exclusively combined with van Kessel again and the pair finished eighth and sixth. In 1986, the team came sixth once more, in a season where Janssen also briefly used 1981 World Champion Frits Kiggen as his passenger. The following year Janssen and van Kessel finished fourth in the competition, but slipped to tenth in 1988. The 1989 season saw the pairs best result so far, finishing second in the World Championship, 26 points behind champions Christoph and Andreas Hüsser.

Janssen started the 1990 season with van Kessel as his passenger once more but switched to Tiny Janssen after two Grand Prix. The new combination performed well, eventually taking out the World Championship with a 13-point gap from Germans Michael Garhammer and Ralf Haas.

The 1991 season saw Janssen compete in the World Championship for the last time, using four different passengers during the season, Epe Willems, Tiny Janssen, Ron Varga and van Kessel. With the later two, he also took out the Dutch national championship. In this event, he beat 1991 and 1992 World Champions Eimbert Timmermans and Eric Verhagen by three points while he finished his last World Championship campaign in sixth place. After this season, Janssen retired from both the World and the Dutch Championship.

== Racing record ==
=== Sidecarcross World Championship ===
Benny Janssen 's results in the Sidecarcross World Championship were:.

Season	Passenger(s)	Equipment	Position	Points	Races	Wins	Second	Third
1982	Frans Geurts van Kessel	Yamaha-Wasp	27	3	4	—	—	—
1983	Frans Geurts van Kessel Henk van Heek	Yamaha-Wasp	10	39	12	—	—	2
1984	Frans Geurts van Kessel	Yamaha-Wasp	8	131	20	—	2	1
1985	Frans Geurts van Kessel	Yamaha-Wasp	6	136	8	—	1	2
1986	Frans Geurts van Kessel Frits Kiggen	Maico-EML	6	220	22	2	2	1
1987	Frans Geurts van Kessel	Jumbo-EML	4	204	20	1	2	1
1988	Frans Geurts van Kessel Frits Kiggen	Jumbo-EML	10	138	20	—	2	—
1989	Frans Geurts van Kessel	Honda-EML	2	298	24	3	4	3
1990	Frans Geurts van Kessel Tiny Janssen	Honda-EML	1	220	18	5	5	1
1991	Frans Geurts van Kessel Epe Willems Ron Varga	Zabel-EML	6	146	10	3	2	2
	Overall 1982 - 1991			1,535	158	14	20	13

== Honours ==
=== World Championship ===
- Champions: (1) 1990
- Runners-up: (1) 1989

=== Netherlands ===
- Dutch national championship:
- Champions: (1) 1991
- Runners-up: (1) 1984

Sporting positions
Preceded by Christoph Hüsser	Sidecarcross World Champion; 1990	Succeeded by Eimbert Timmermans
Preceded by Eimbert Timmermans	Dutch national sidecarcross champion 1991	Succeeded by Eimbert Timmermans
