= John Bohler =

English botanist (

- Born: 31 December 1797; South Wingfield
- Died: 24 September 1872 (aged 74); Sheffield
- Occupation: Botanist

John Bohler (31 December 1797 – 24 September 1872) was an English botanist.

== Biography ==
Bohler born at South Wingfield, near Alfreton, Derbyshire on 31 December 1797. He was a simple stocking-weaver, but his early instincts led him to gather plants, and he became a collector of medicinal plants for the doctors. He then took up the science of botany, and became an expert field botanist and microscopist, traversing England, Ireland, and Wales. In time he became acquainted with the 'habitats' of all our indigenous flowers, and made a special study of lichens. In 1835-7 he published the exsiccata series 'Lichenes Britannici, or Specimens of the Lichens of Britain,' containing sixteen monthly fasciculi, each of eight actual specimens, collected and mounted by himself, with original descriptions, &c.—128 in all, at 3s. 6d. each—forming a valuable work which is now very scarce. The British Museum has no copy of it, but the Botanische Staatssammlung München has. About 1860 he explored Snowdon and the adjacent mountains and hills under the auspices of a botanical committee of the British Association. Later in life he became a great collector of rare fungi, gathered from their widely scattered localities throughout the land. Dr. Aveling's fine folio, 'Roche Abbey, Yorkshire,' London, 1870, has in the appendix 'A Flora of Roche Abbey,' by Bohler. He also compiled 'The Flora of Sherwood Forest' for Mr. Robert White's 'Worksop, the Dukeries, and Sherwood Forest,' Worksop, 1875, 4to, and arranged his materials in accordance with Joseph Dalton Hooker's 'Student's Flora.' He also contributed botanical papers and notes to various scientific journals. He died at Sheffield on 24 September 1872.
