= Buehler's Fresh Foods =

American supermarket chain

Buehler Food Markets Inc.

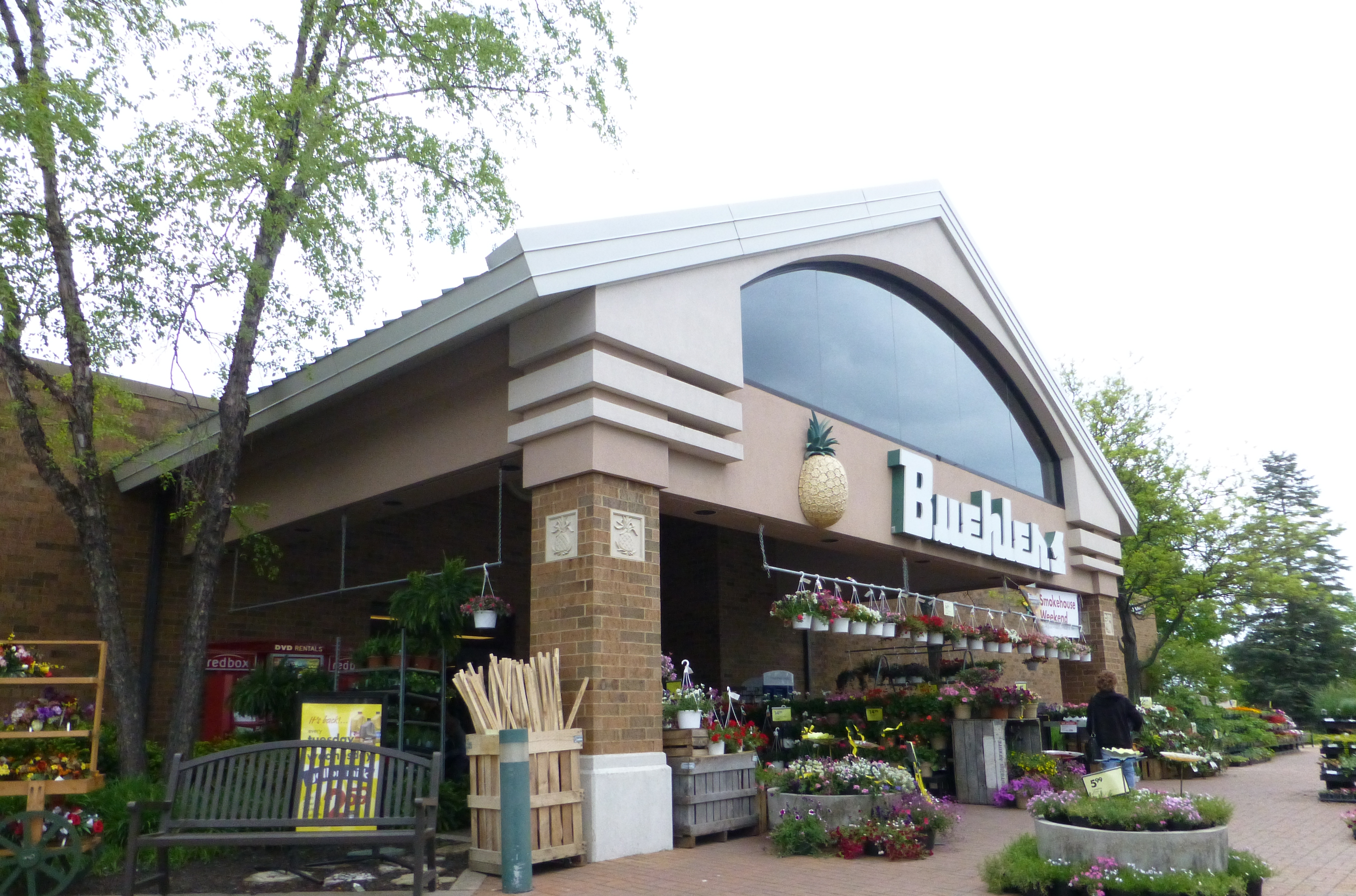
- Wooster store
- Trade name: Buehler's Fresh Foods
- Company type: employee-owned
- Industry: Retail
- Founded: 1929; 97 years ago New Philadelphia, Ohio, U.S.
- Founder: Ed and Helen Buehler
- Headquarters: Wooster, Ohio, United States
- Number of locations: 14
- Area served: North-Central Ohio
- Products: Artisan Bakery, Beer, Dairy, Deli, Grocery, Meat, General Merchandise
- Services: Online shopping and home delivery; Catering; Restaurants; Pizza Shop; Sandwich Shop; Pick-Up Lane; Curbside Service
- Revenue: ▲$382.1 million
- Number of employees: 2,100 (2020)
- Parent: Previously: E&H Family Group
- Website: www.buehlers.com

Buehler's Fresh Foods, also known as Buehler's, is a grocery store chain founded in 1929 in New Philadelphia, Ohio, US, by Ed and Helen Buehler. In 1932, Buehler's opened its second location in Wooster, Ohio.

Buehler's is the largest purchaser of local Amish produce at the Mt. Hope Auction. The company also sources dairy and meats from local and/or sustainable farms.

On October 18, 2017, Buehler's parent company, E&H Family Group, announced its decision to sell the 13 supermarkets to employees in the form of an employee stock ownership program (ESOP). The ESOP is operated by Buehler’s Fresh Foods, led by an experienced team of grocery industry veterans, including Mike Davidson, Buehler’s Fresh Foods President and COO, Yvonne Monea, VP of Human Resources, and Paul Stefaniuk, VP of Store Operations.

== Other Business Ventures ==
E&H Hardware Group, a subsidiary of E&H Family Group, continues to operate 31 hardware stores in Ohio under the E&H Ace Hardware name. The Buehler's ESOP sale has no impact on E&H Hardware Group.

== Opening and Closing of Stores ==
- On January 4, 2016, Buehler's announced its intention to permanently close its Delaware supermarket, at 800 West Central Avenue, Delaware, Ohio. In that release, Buehler's stated that the anticipated closing date would be mid-to-late February 2016 and cited competition in the Delaware market and failed turnaround initiatives as the main reason for the closure. This marked the first closure of a supermarket, not relating to a move, in the company's history. The Delaware store officially closed on February 13, 2016, affecting 131 employees. The closing reduced the supermarkets in the company from 15 to 14.
- Late in the afternoon on Monday, September 26, 2016, Buehler's announced in an official press release the closure of its Brunswick supermarket, at 3688 Center Road, Brunswick, Ohio. Buehler's stated that the supermarket had been under-performing for some time in the competitive Medina County market. 125 workers were affected as a result of the supermarket closing. The last official day of business at the Brunswick location was October 21, 2016. This cut Buehler’s supermarket roster from 14 to 13.
- On November 17, 2021, a new Buehler's Fresh Foods opened in Galion, OH increasing their store count back to 14.
