= Ernst Behler =

German philosopher (1928–1997)

Ernst Behler (4 September 1928 in Essen – 16 September 1997 in Seattle) was a German philosopher and college professor.

Behler was a dozent at the Rheinische Friedrich-Wilhelms University in Bonn in the 1960s. In 1976 Behler became the founding Chairman of the Department of Comparative Literature at the University of Washington in Seattle. His research included Friedrich von Schlegel, Friedrich Nietzsche and the early Romanticism. Also notable are his books on irony.

== Publications ==
- Irony and the discourse of modernity (1990)
- Klassische Ironie, romantische Ironie, tragische Ironie (1972)
- Ironie und literarische Moderne (1997)
