= Hans-Georg Bohle =

German geographer (1948–2014)

Hans-Georg Bohle (3 March 1948 – 20 September 2014) was a German geographer and international development researcher.

== Background ==
Bohle studied at the University of Göttingen from 1968 to 1974, and conducted PhD research in Madras, India from 1976 to 1977, gaining his Promotion (1979) and Habilitation (1985) from that university. He was Lecturer and assistant professor in the Geography Department at Göttingen from 1977 to 1986, then relocated to the Department for Cultural Geography, University of Freiburg as Professor, until 1995. From 1995 to 2004 he was Professor and chair for Geography of South Asia at the University of Heidelberg, and from 2004 until his retirement in 2013, Professor and chair for Cultural Geography and Development Geography at the Geography Department, University of Bonn.

In 2005 he was appointed a Munich Re Foundation Chair on Social Vulnerability, UNU-EHS.

== Scholarly contributions ==
Bohle was internationally known for his important contributions to human vulnerability research. His basic work on the concept of social vulnerability in the context of poverty, hunger, water crises and health burdens in developing countries has become an integral part of disaster and risk research in the social sciences. He later focused on vulnerability, adaptation, resilience and human security in relation to global environmental change. His regional focus was on South Asia (India, Pakistan, Nepal, Bangladesh, Sri Lanka).

Bohle served on the Steering Committee of GECHS (Global Environmental Change and Human Security) and on the International Scientific Advisory Board of GECAFS (Global Environmental Change and Food Systems).

== Awards ==
- Member of Academia Europaea (2002)
- Member of the German Academy of Sciences Leopoldina (2007)
- Awarded the Graf-von-Linden-Medaille of the ”Gesellschaft für Erdund Völkerkunde" (2007)

== Selected publications ==
Hans-Georg Bohle published 12 monographs, about 80 articles in scientific journals and about 60 book chapters.

- 1993 with Watts, M. J.: Hunger, Famine and the Space of Vulnerability, In: GeoJournal 30.2, 1993, pp. 117–125
- 1994 with Downing, T.E. and Watts, M.J.: Climate Change and Social Vulnerability: Toward a Sociology and Geography of Food Insecurity, In: Global Environmental Change, Vol. 4, 1994, pp. 37–48
- 1999 with Adhikari, J.: Food Crisis in Nepal. How Mountain Farmers Cope, Adroit Publishers, Delhi 1999
- 2007 Living with Vulnerability. Livelihoods and Human Security in Risky Environments, InterSecTions, Publications Series of UNU-EHS No. 6/2007, Bonn
- 2007 Geographische Entwicklungsforschung, In: Gebhardt, H. et al. (eds.), Geographie. Physische Geographie und Humangeographie. Elsevier/Spektrum Akademischer Verlag, Heidelberg, pp. 797–815
- 2007 Leben mit Risiko: Resilience als neues Paradigma für die Risikowelten von morgen, In: Felgentreff, C. und Glade, T. (eds.), Naturrisiken und Sozialkatastrophen, Elsevier/Spektrum Akademischer Verlag, Heidelberg, pp. 435–441
- 2007 Geographies of Violence and Vulnerability. An Actor-Oriented Analysis of the Civil War in Sri Lanka, In: Erdkunde 61 (2), pp. 129–146
- 2007 with Fünfgeld, H.: The Political Ecology of Violence: Contested Entitlements and Politicised Livelihoods in Eastern Sri Lanka, In: Development and Change, Vol. 38 (4), pp. 665–687
- 2009 with Etzold, B., Keck, M., Zingel W.-P.: Informality as Agency. Negotiating the Modes of Regulation in Contested Urban Areas, In: Die Erde, Jg. 140, H. 1, pp. 3–24
- 2009 Sustainable Livelihood Security. Evolution and Application, In: Brauch, Hans Günter; Grin, John; Mesjasz, Czeslaw; Krummenacher, Heinz; Chadha Behera, Navnita; Chourou, Béchir; Oswald Spring, Ursula; Kameri-Mbote, Patricia (eds.): Facing Global Environmental Change: Environmental, Human, Energy, Food, Health and Water Security Concepts. Hexagon Series on Human and Environmental Security and Peace, vol. 4, Berlin-Heidelberg-New York-Hong Kong-London-Milan-Paris-Tokyo: Springer-Verlag, pp. 521–528
