= Otto Böhler =

Austrian silhouette artist (1847–1913)

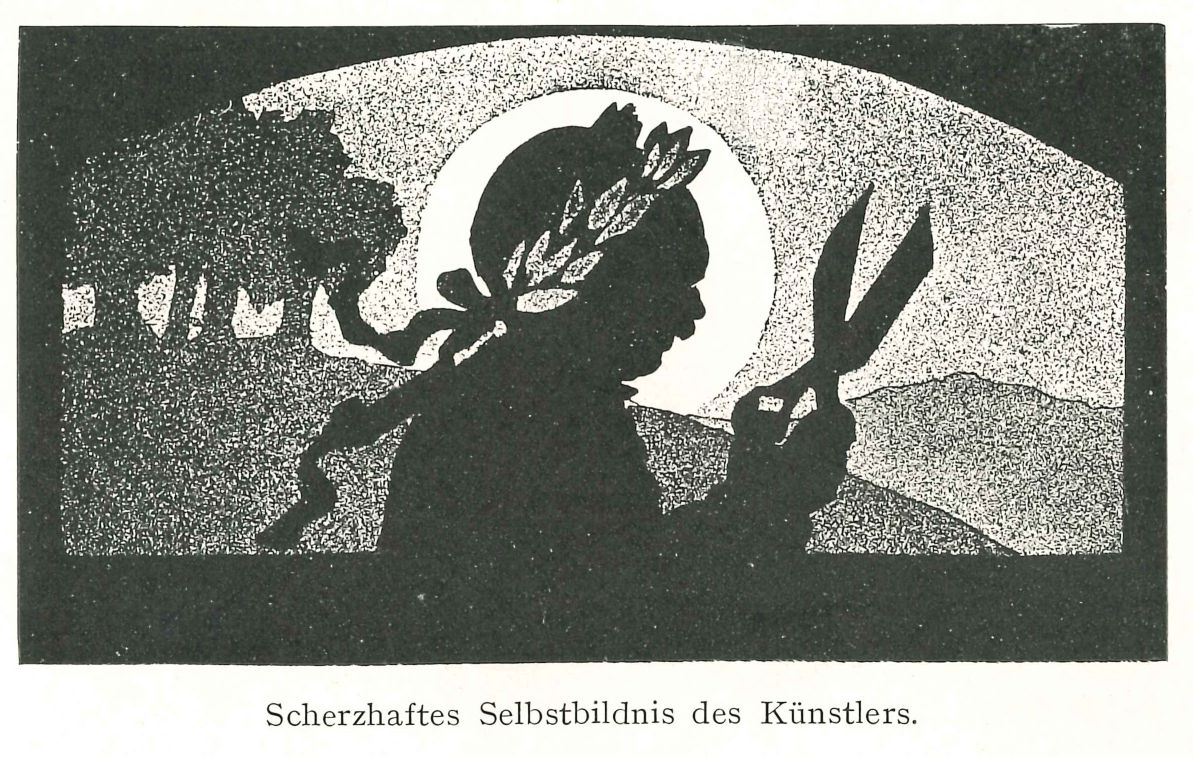
- Jocular self-portrait of the artist, ~1890, silhouette
- Born: 11 November 1847; Frankfurt
- Died: 5 April 1913 (aged 65); Vienna
- Known for: Silhouette art

Otto Böhler (11 November 1847 – 5 April 1913) was an Austrian silhouette artist who specialized in portraits of many great conductors, composers, and pianists of his time.

== Life ==
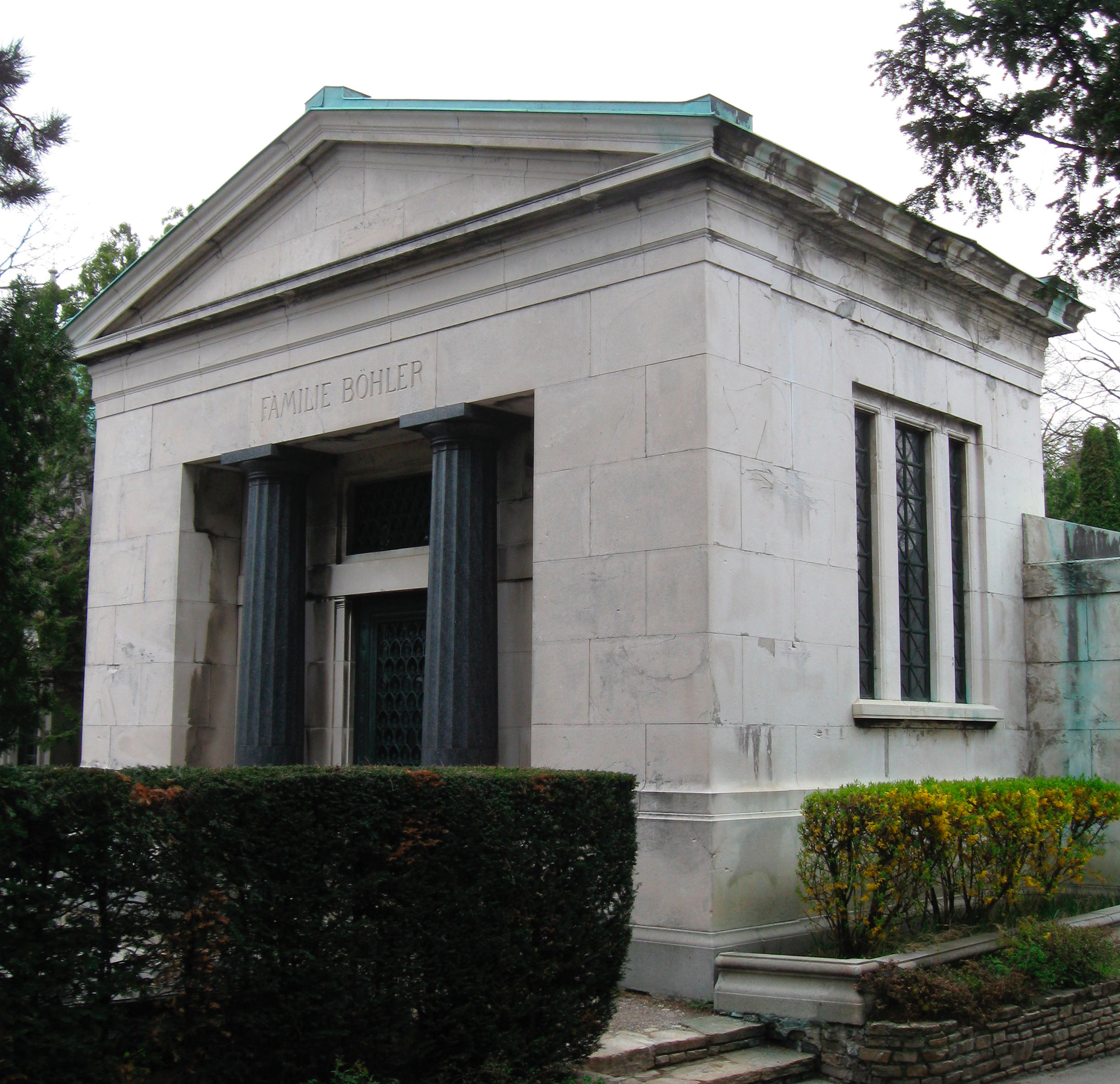
Tomb of the Böhler family

Otto Boehler was the fifth son of the merchant Georg Friedrich Böhler and spent his childhood and youth in Frankfurt am Main. At the University of Tübingen, he studied to PhD philosophy. In 1870 he moved with his brothers Albert (1845–1899) and Friedrich (1849–1914) to Vienna and participated after the death of his brother, Emil (1842–1882) at the family business. Albert and Emil founded a steel industry, which is now part of Böhler-Uddeholm.

Following his artistic talent, he became a pupil of the painter and writer Wenzel Ottokar Noltsch (1835–1908). Soon, however, he turned to the art of the silhouette, and found in his musical environment a rich field. Böhler's friends were to include the singers Amalie Materna, Hermann Winkelmann, Theodor Reichmann, and musicians of the Vienna Philharmonic. In 1876, he attended as a member of the Bayreuth Patrons Association, the first Bayreuth Festival, and paid homage to his "musical god" Richard Wagner.

Böhler was married and had four children. He died in 1913; two years earlier he had been diagnosed with a heart condition. He was buried in the family vault in the Hietzinger Cemetery.

== Art ==
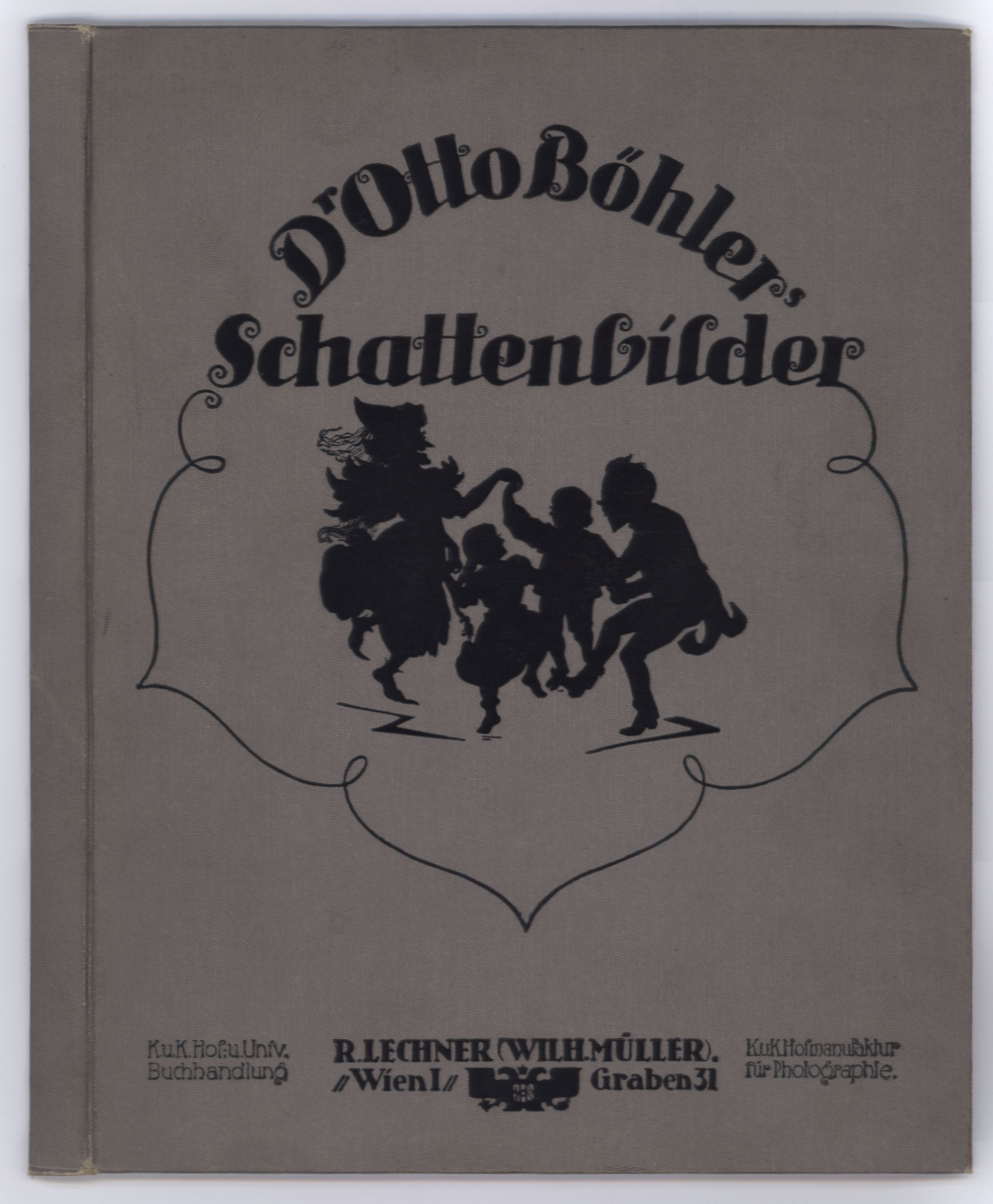
Cover of Dr. Otto Böhler's Schattenbilder

Böhler has held in silhouette almost all the German composers from Bach to Mahler, but also conductors and pianists of his time. The original works remained only sporadically, mainly in museums. His motifs were often reprinted, e.g. on postcards and in newspapers.

Publications

- Dr. Otto Böhler's Schattenbilder. K.u.K. Hof- und Univ.-Buchhandlung in Wien, K.u.K. Hofmanufaktur für Photographie Rudolf Lechner (Wilhelm Müller), Wien 1914.

== Gallery ==
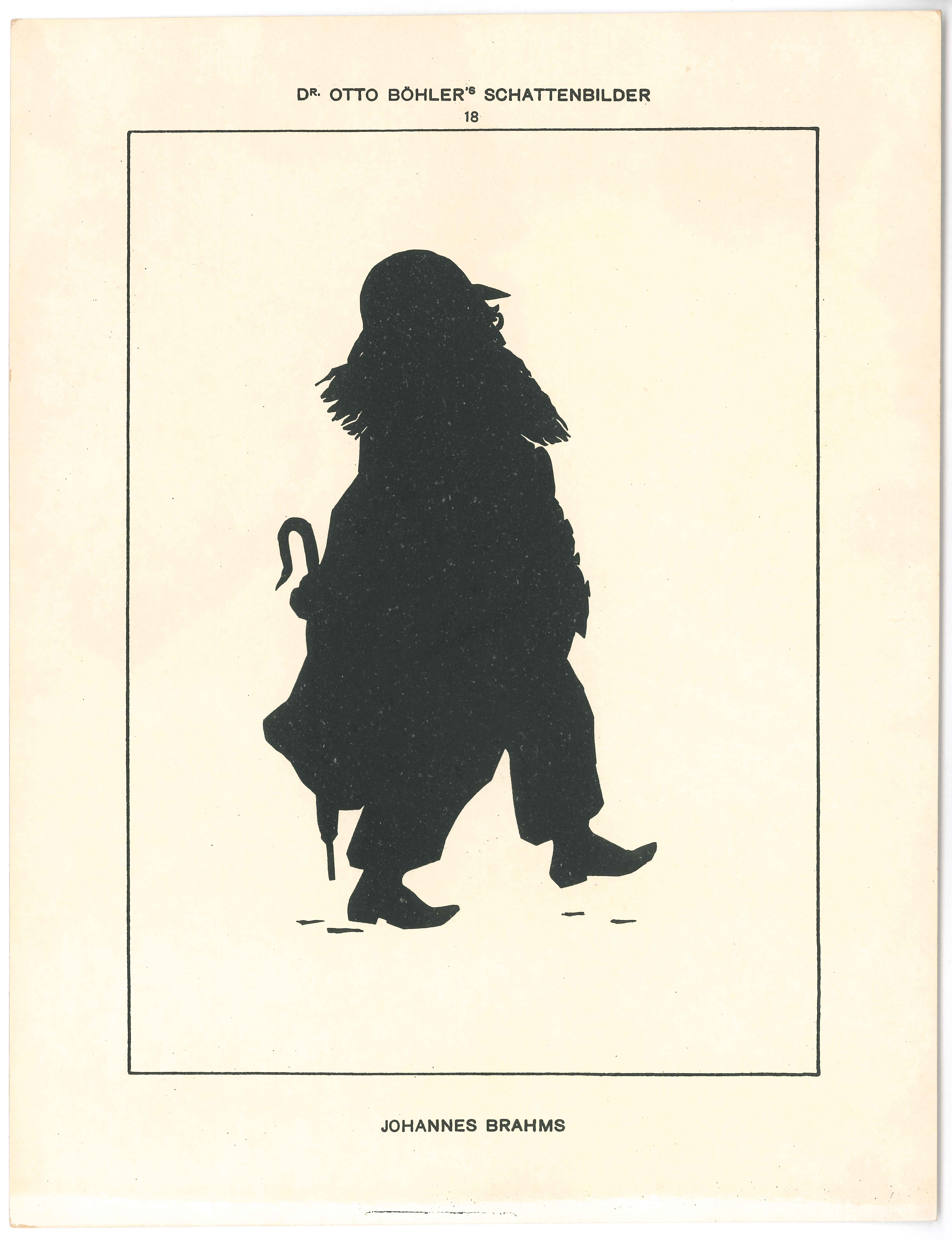
Johannes Brahms

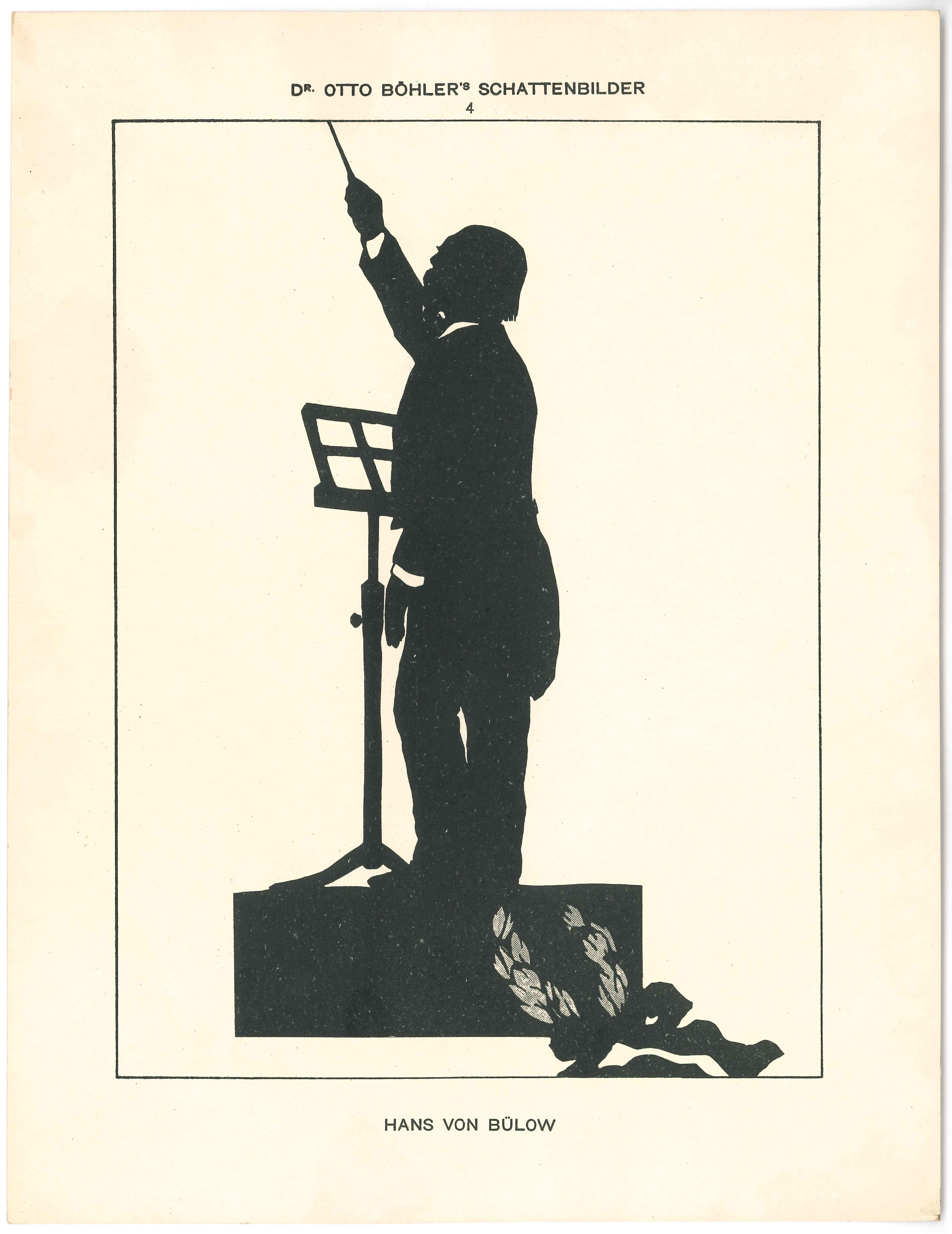
Hans von Bülow

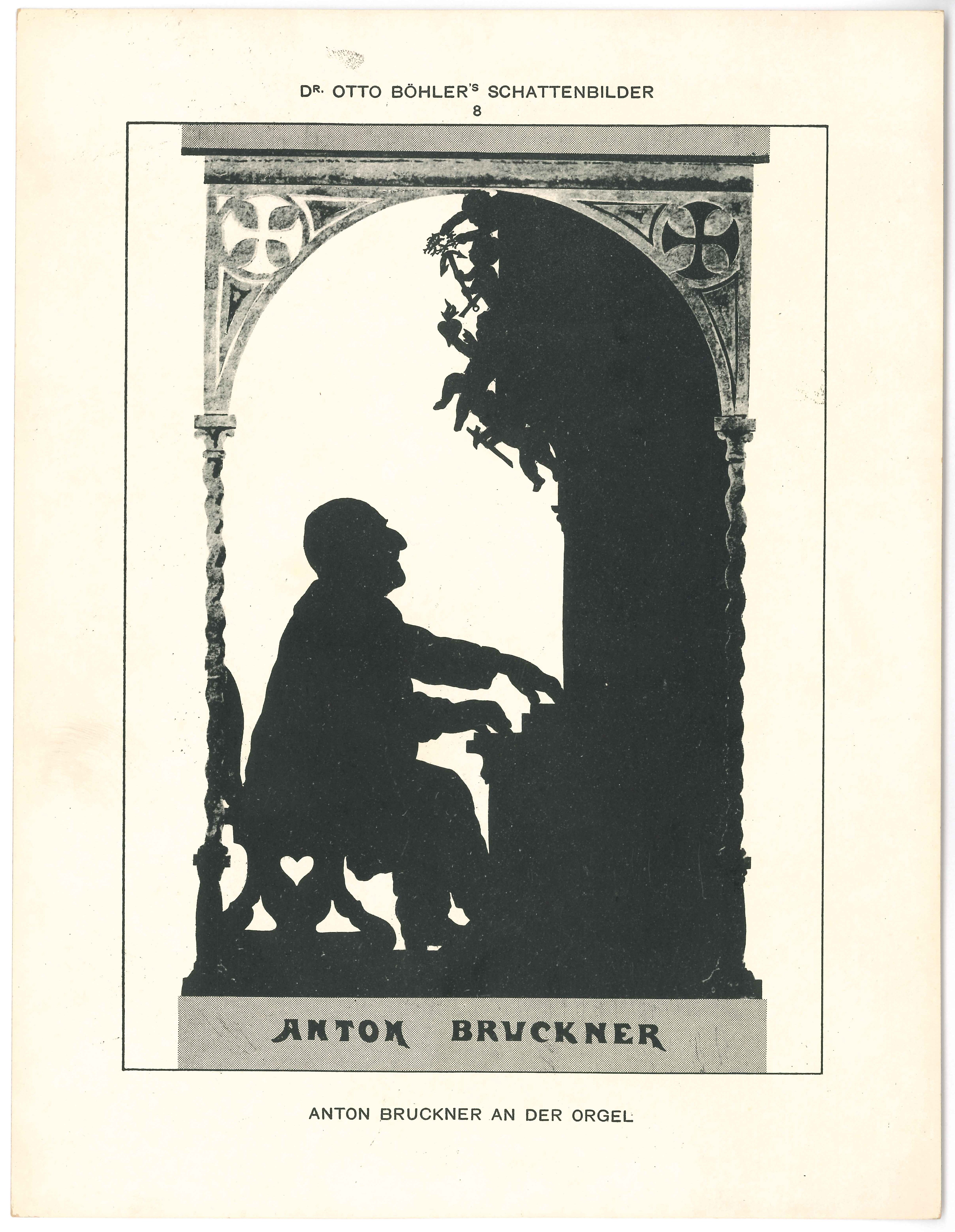
Anton Bruckner

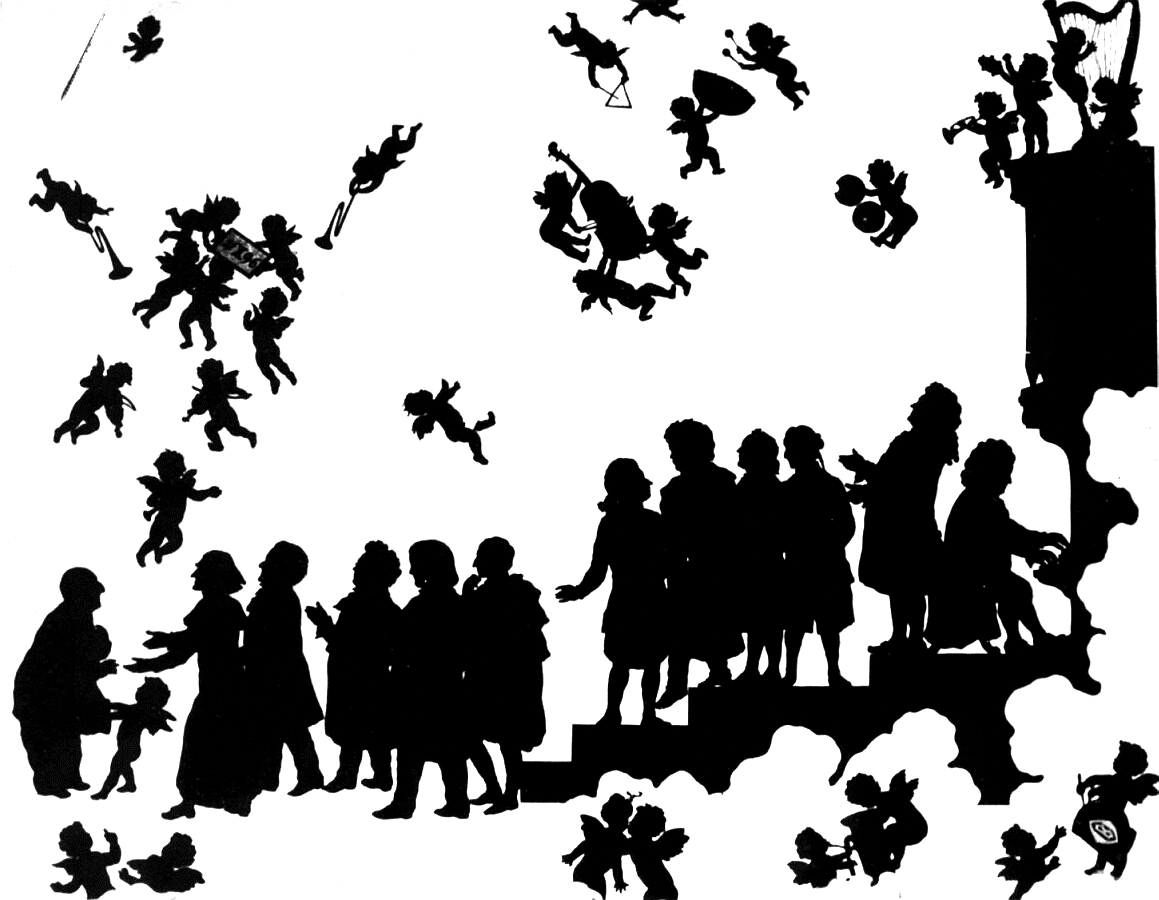
Bruckner arrives in heaven

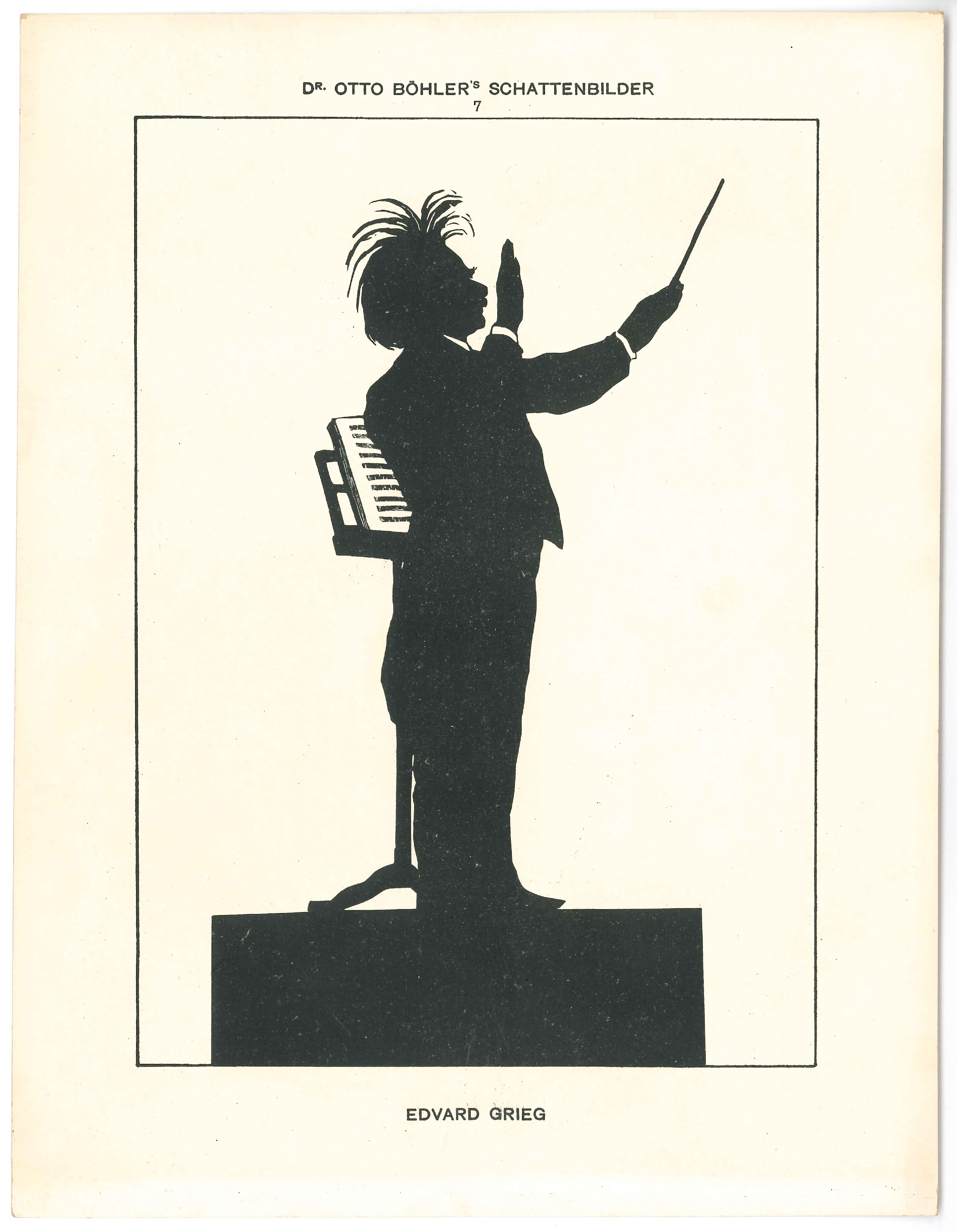
Edvard Grieg

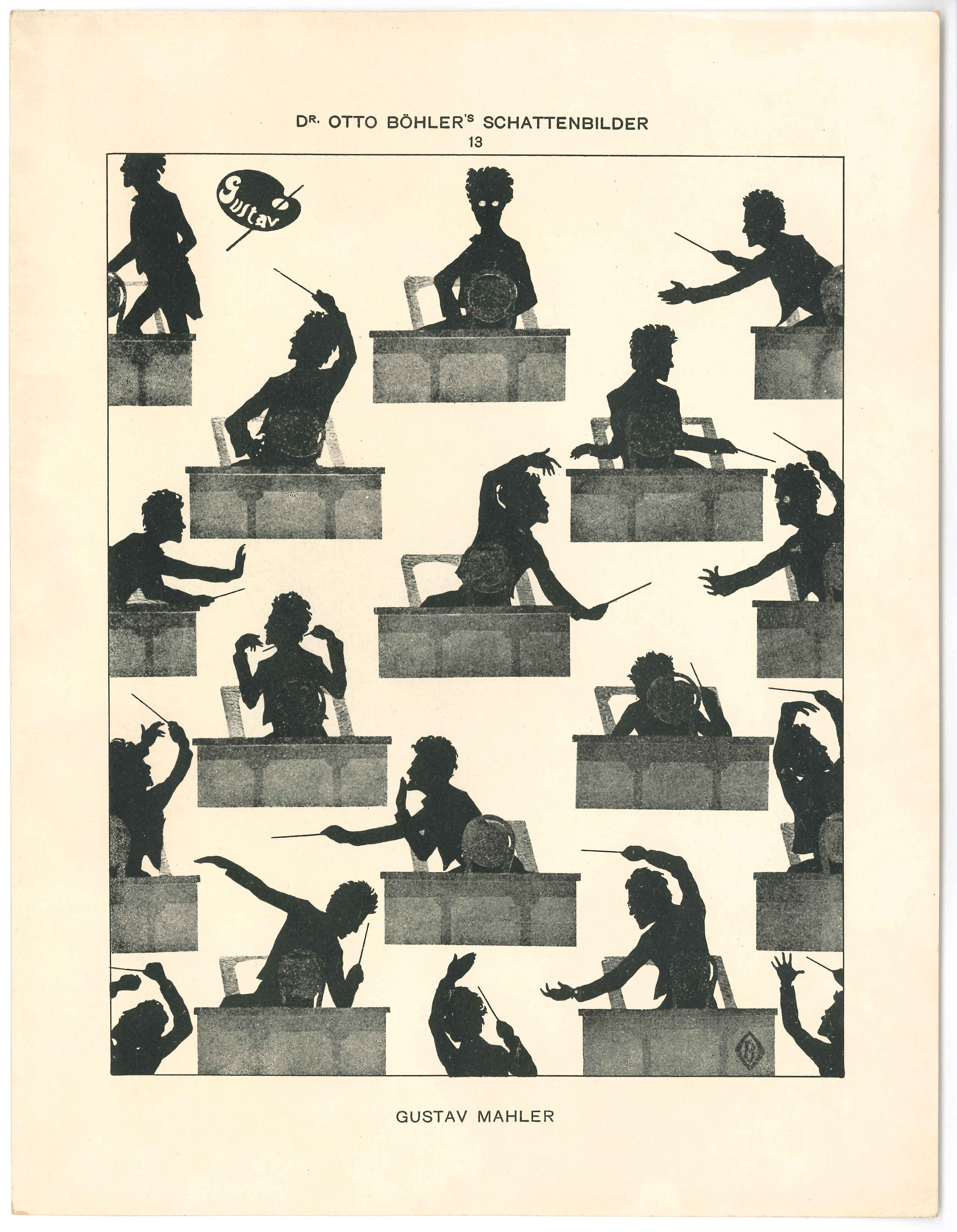
Gustav Mahler

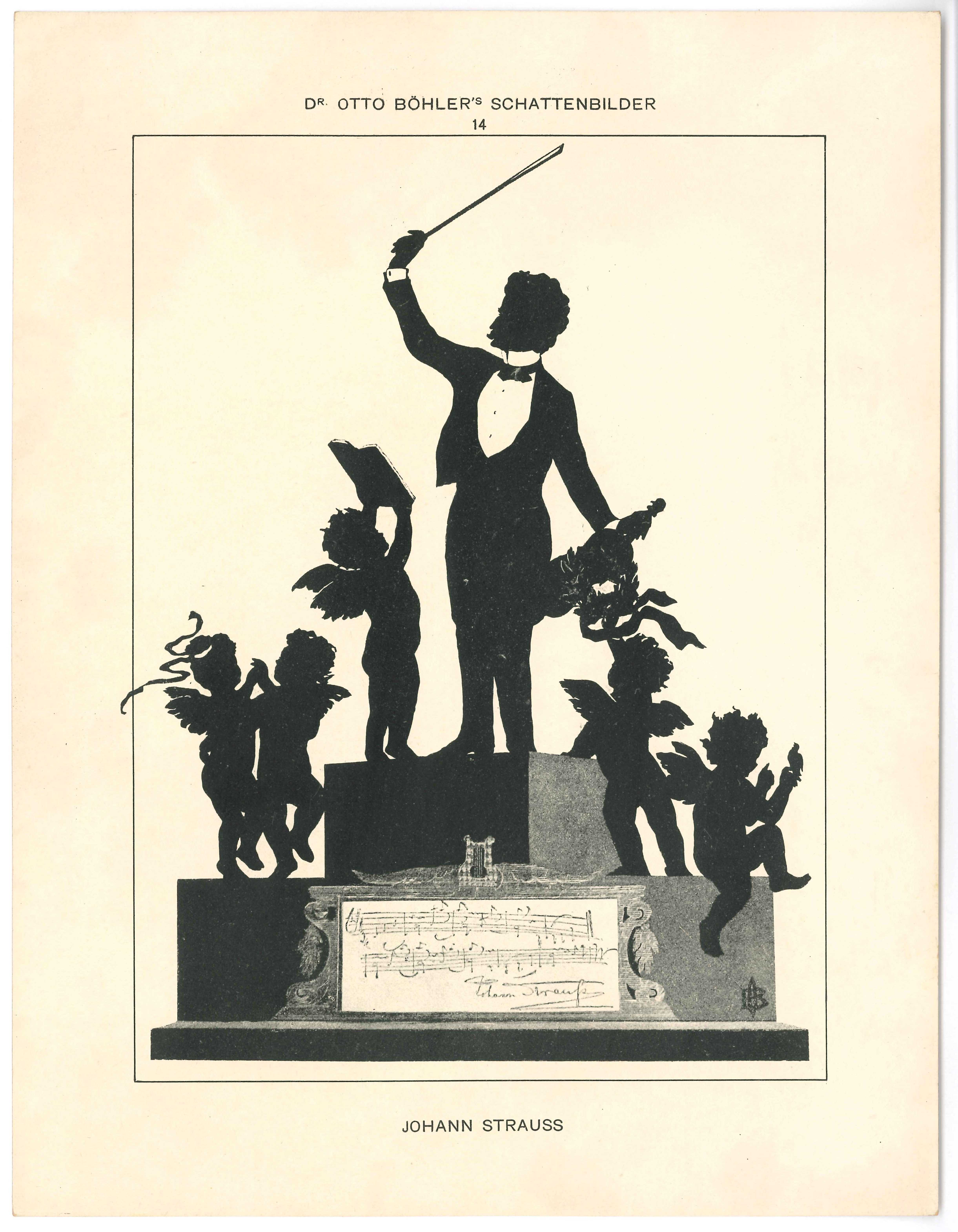
Johann Strauss II

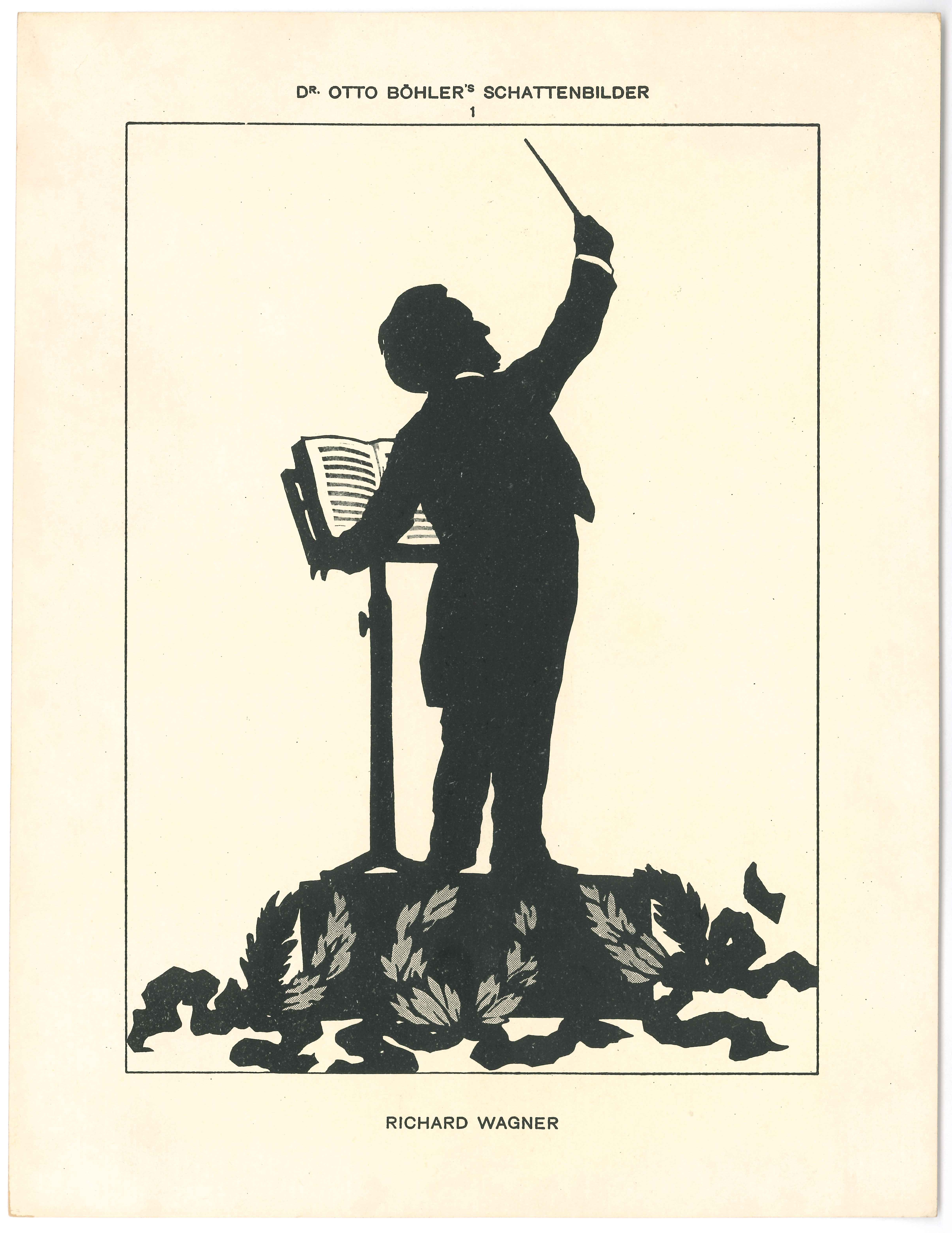
Richard Wagner

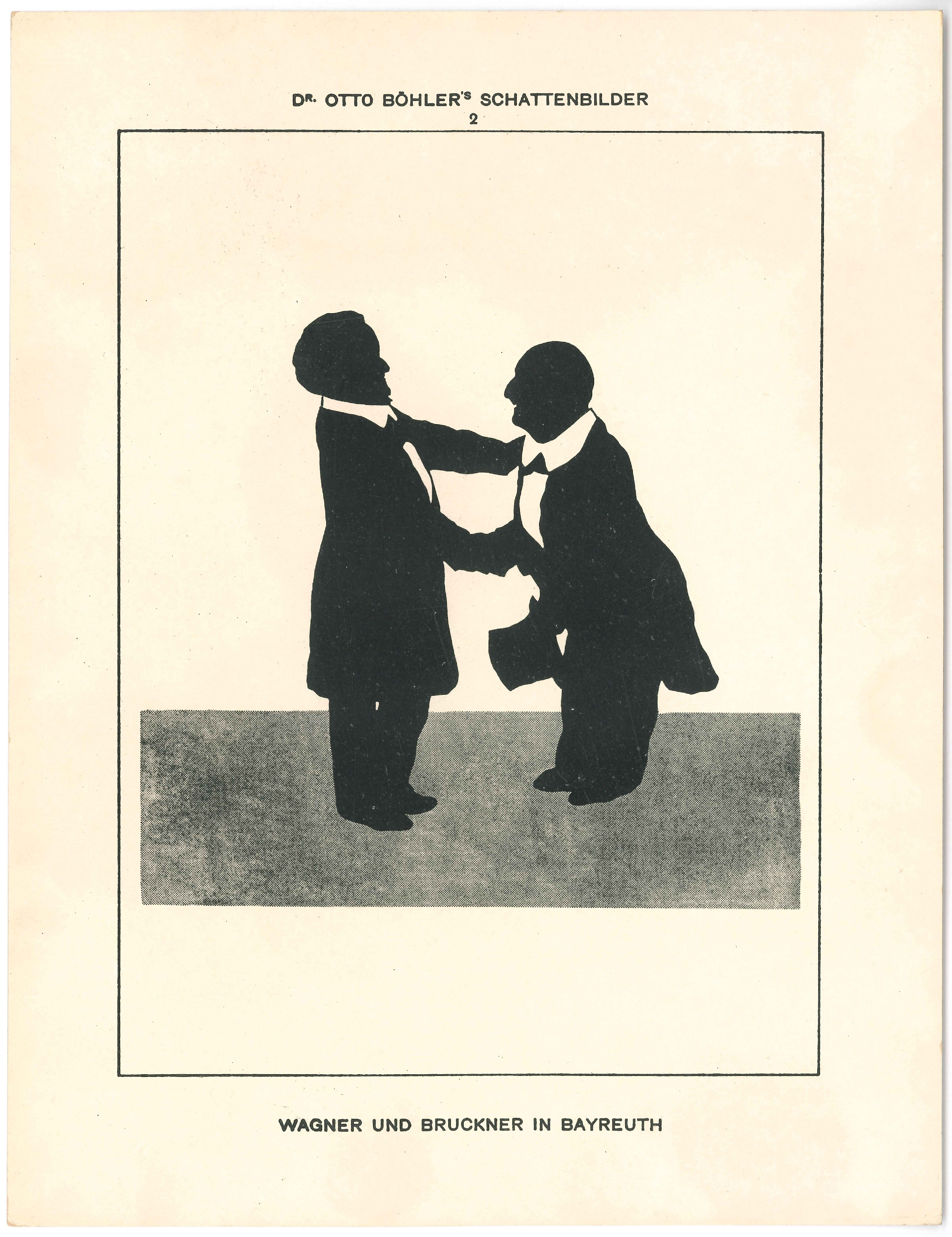
Wagner and Bruckner in Bayreuth (1873)

== Sources ==
- Max Hayek: Dr. Otto Böhler. In: Dr. Otto Böhler's Schattenbilder. Publishing house Lechner, Vienna 1914.
