= Reinhard Böhler =

German motorcycle racer (1945–1995)

- Nationality: Germany
- Born: 1945
- Died: January 19, 1995
Motorcycle racing career statistics
Sidecarcross World Championship
Active years	1971 - 1985
Championships	(1) 1980
1985 championship position	8th
Starts / Wins / Podiums / Poles / F. laps / Points; 137 / 19 / 63 / / / 1154

Reinhard Böhler (1945 – 19 January 1995) was a German sidecarcross rider and the first-ever World Champion in the sport, together with his passenger Siegfried Müller.

Böhler has also won the German national sidecarcross championship seven times, from 1975 to 1977, 1979, 1980, 1983 and 1984, which, as of 2009, still stands as the record.

== Biography ==
Böhler, a native of the South Baden region of Germany, started racing motocross in 1963, originally in the solo class. He soon moved across to sidecarcross, where he initially had to race mostly in neighbouring Switzerland because the sport was not yet very well established in Germany at the time. He started for the motocross club in Schopfheim.

Böhler became the most successful German sidecarcross racer, being the only German to have won the world championship and also the record holder in national German sidecarcross championships. He retired from the sport in the mid-1980s, when he was diagnosed with stomach cancer. He supported his son Achim in his, less successful, sidecarcross career and died on 19 January 1995, at age 49.

== Sidecarcross world championship results ==
Böhler made his debut in the FIM Cup, a predecessor of the world championship, in 1971, in the first year of the competition. With his passenger Walter Frech he competed in only one race, the Swiss GP in Wohlen. In the four years the FIM Cup was held, he only competed in one or two races of it per season.

With the re-branding of the competition as FIM European Championship, Böhler continued to make only occasional appearances. Böhler concentrated on the German championship at the time, winning national titles in 1975, 1976 and 1977. The year 1977 saw him also for the first time competing in every race of the European championship. With Hans Georg Peppinghausen as his passenger, he came second in the championship and won his first race, finishing on top in both races of the Austrian GP at Feldkirch.

The following two seasons proofed less successful, coming only sixth and ninth in the competition and losing the German title to Josef Brockhausen.

From 1980 onwards, the European championship was renamed the FIM World Championship and Reinhard Böhler, together with passenger Siegfried Müller, became the first world champion and the only ones from Germany so far. They took out the title with an 88-point gap to the second placed team and also won the German championship again.

Böhler was unable to defend his title in 1981, missing a number of races and having to swap passengers during the season. The following season, he only took part in very few events and came 19th overall.

Böhler returned to old form in 1983 and 1984, winning the German title for a sixth and seventh time and coming third in both world championship seasons. The 1985 season was his last in the championship, taking out his last race win in the first GP of the season in Warching and then taking part in only the occasional GP during the season.

=== Season by season ===
The competition which was to become the sidecarcross world championship in 1980 originated as the FIM Cup in 1971 and was renamed to European championship in 1975. Böhler's results in these three competitions were:

Season	Passenger	Equipment	Position	Points	Races	Wins	Second	Third
1971	Walter Frech	Suzuki	28	5	1	—	—	—
1972	Walter Frech	Suzuki-Kawasaki	20	7	2	—	—	—
1973	Walter Frech	Yamaha-Wasp	32	4	1	—	—	—
1974	Egon Wuchner	Yamaha-Wasp	14	22	2	—	1	1
1975	Egon Wuchner	Yamaha-Wasp	16	21	6	—	—	—
1976	Walter Frech	Yamaha-Wasp	21	13	2	—	—	—
1977	Hans Georg Peppinghausen	Yamaha-Wasp	2	148	16	2	7	1
1978	Hans Georg Peppinghausen	Yamaha-Wasp	6	77	14	1	2	1
1979	Siegfried Müller	Yamaha-Wasp	9	50	10	—	1	1
1979	(Switzerland) Karl Büsser	Yamaha-Wasp	9	10	2	—	—	1
1980	Siegfried Müller	Yamaha-Wasp	1	236	22	6	7	2
1981	Siegfried Müller	Yamaha-Wasp	5	47	6	—	1	2
1981	Eric Mies	Yamaha-Wasp	5	45	6	1	1	1
1982	Franz Burkhard	Yamaha-Wasp	19	9	4	—	—	—
1983	Franz Burkhard	Zabel-Wasp	3	139	18	2	3	4
1984	Ekhard Bauer	Wasp	3	215	16	6	2	2
1985	Jürgen Hassold	Wasp	8	106	10	1	1	2
	Overall 1971 - 1985			1154	137	19	26	18

Source:"REINHARD BOHLER GP RECORD". John Davey.

- All passengers are German nationals unless otherwise shown.

== Honours ==
=== World Championship ===
- Champions: (1) 1980

=== European Championship ===
- Runners-up: (1) 1977

=== Germany ===
- Champions: (7) 1975, 1976, 1977, 1979, 1980, 1983, 1984

Sporting positions
Preceded by new competition	Sidecarcross World Champion; 1980	Succeeded by Ton van Heugten
Preceded by Herbert Simon	German national sidecarcross champion 1975 - 1977	Succeeded by Josef Brockhausen
Preceded by Josef Brockhausen	German national sidecarcross champion 1979 - 1980	Succeeded by Josef Brockhausen
Preceded by Josef Brockhausen	German national sidecarcross champion 1983 - 1984	Succeeded by Walter Netterscheid
