= Bohler Canyon =

Coordinates: 37.893°N 119.148°W

Bohler Canyon is a valley in Mono County, California, in the United States. 85 species of birds have been identified in Bohler Canyon, and many arborglyphs where Basque shepherds and others carved their names into trees.

Bohler Canyon was named for Joseph Bohler, an early settler.
