= Johann Gottlieb Buhle =

German philosopher (1763–1821)

- Born: 29 September 1763
- Died: 11 August 1821 (aged 57)
- Education: Doctor of Science (1786)
- Scientific career
- Fields: Philosophy
- Workplaces: Imperial Moscow University

Johann Gottlieb Buhle (German: [ˈbuːlə]; 29 September 1763 – 11 August 1821), German scholar and philosopher, was born at Brunswick and educated at Göttingen. He became professor of philosophy at Göttingen, Moscow (in 1804), and Brunswick. Of his numerous publications, the most important are the Lehrbuch der Geschichte der Philosophie und einer kritischen Literatur derselben (8 volumes, 1796–1804), and Geschichte der neuern Philosophie seit der Epoche der Wiederherstellung der Wissenschaften (6 volumes, 1800–1804). The latter, elaborate and well written, is lacking in critical appreciation and proportion; there are French and Italian translations. He edited Aratus (2 volumes, 1793, 1801) and part of Aristotle (Bipontine edition, vols. I–V, 1791–1804).

In 1804 he argued that speculative Freemasonry arose in England between 1629 and 1635 through the work of Robert Fludd, who had earlier been introduced to Rosicrucianism by Michael Maier.

Buhle died at Brunswick.

== Bibliography ==
- Imperial Moscow University: 1755–1917: encyclopedic dictionary. Moscow: Russian political encyclopedia (ROSSPEN). 2010. pp. 103–105. ISBN 978-5-8243-1429-8 – via A. Andreev, D. Tsygankov.
- Vladimir Abashnik, Johann Gottlieb Gerhard Buhle, in: The Dictionary of eighteenth-century German philosophers. General editors: Heiner F. Klemme, Manfred Kuehn. In 3 vol. London: Continuum International Publishing Group Ltd., 2010, Vol. 1: A – G, pp. 169–170.
